= List of radio stations in South Dakota =

The following is a list of FCC-licensed radio stations in the U.S. state of South Dakota, which can be sorted by their call signs, frequencies, cities of license, licensees, and programming formats.

== List of radio stations ==
Call sign	Frequency	City of License	Owner	Format
KABD	107.7 FM	Ipswich	Dakota Broadcasting, LLC	Adult hits
KAOR	91.1 FM	Vermillion	The University of South Dakota	Alternative
KASD	90.3 FM	Rapid City	Community Broadcasting, Inc.	Christian talk
KAUR	89.1 FM	Sioux Falls	Augustana College Association	Variety
KBFO	106.7 FM	Aberdeen	Prairie Winds Broadcasting, Inc.	Contemporary hit radio
KBFS	1450 AM	Belle Fourche	Tri State Communications, LLC	News Talk Information
KBHB	810 AM	Sturgis	Homeslice Media Group, LLC	News Talk Information
KBHE-FM	89.3 FM	Rapid City	South Dakota Board of Directors for Ed. Telecommunications	Public radio
KBHU-FM	89.1 FM	Spearfish	Black Hills State University	Alternative
KBJM	1400 AM	Lemmon	Media Associates, Inc.	Country (day)/Oldies (night)
KBRK	1430 AM	Brookings	Alpha 3E License, LLC	Full service
KBRK-FM	93.7 FM	Brookings	Alpha 3E License, LLC	Hot adult contemporary
KBWS-FM	102.9 FM	Sisseton	Prairie Winds Broadcasting, Inc.	Country
KCCR	1240 AM	Pierre	Riverfront Broadcasting	Full Service
KCCR-FM	104.5 FM	Blunt	Riverfront Broadcasting LLC	Active rock
KCSD	90.9 FM	Sioux Falls	South Dakota Board of Directors for Educational Telecommunications	Public radio
KCVP	88.3 FM	Pierre	Community Broadcasting, Inc.	Christian talk and teaching (Bott Radio Network)
KDBX	107.1 FM	Clear Lake	Alpha 3E License, LLC	Classic rock
KDDX	101.1 FM	Spearfish	Riverfront Broadcasting, LLC	Active rock
KDKO	89.5 FM	Lake Andes	Native American Community Board, Inc.	Community radio
KDLO-FM	96.9 FM	Watertown	Alpha 3E License, LLC	Country
KDSD-FM	90.9 FM	Pierpont	South Dakota Board of Directors for Ed. Telecommunications	Public radio
KDSJ	980 AM	Deadwood	Riverfront Broadcasting, LLC	Full service
KEEA	90.1 FM	Aberdeen	American Family Association	Religious Talk (AFR)
KELO	1320 AM	Sioux Falls	Midwest Communications, Inc.	News Talk Information
KELO-FM	95.7 FM	Dell Rapids	Midwest Communications, Inc.	Adult contemporary
KELQ	107.9 FM	Flandreau	Midwest Communications, Inc.	News Talk Information
KESD	88.3 FM	Brookings	South Dakota Board of Directors for Ed. Telecommunications	Public radio
KFCR	1490 AM	Custer	Mt. Rushmore Broadcasting, Inc.	Adult contemporary
KFMH	101.9 FM	Belle Fourche	Bad Lands Broadcasting Company, Inc.	Classic hits
KFND-LP	97.1 FM	Rapid City	Calvary Chapel of the Black Hills	Religious Teaching
KFXS	100.3 FM	Rapid City	HomeSlice Media Group, LLC	Classic rock
KGFX	1060 AM	Pierre	James River Broadcasting Company, Inc.	Classic country
KGFX-FM	92.7 FM	Pierre	James River Broadcasting Company, Inc.	Contemporary hit radio
KGHW	90.7 FM	Onida	Radio 74 Internationale	Religious (Radio 74 Internationale)
KGIM	1420 AM	Aberdeen	Prairie Winds Broadcasting, Inc.	Sports (FSR)
KGIM-FM	103.7 FM	Redfield	Prairie Winds Broadcasting, Inc.	Country
KGRH	88.1 FM	Loomis	The Praise Network, Inc.	Christian contemporary
KGRJ	89.9 FM	Chamberlain	The Praise Network, Inc.	Christian contemporary
KGWD	94.5 FM	Sioux Falls	Real Presence Radio	Christian talk
KIJV	1340 AM	Huron	Riverfront Broadcasting, LLC	Contemporary hit radio
KIKN-FM	100.5 FM	Salem	Townsquare License, LLC	Country
KILI	90.1 FM	Porcupine	Lakota Communications Inc.	World Ethnic
KIMM	1150 AM	Rapid City	Black Hills Broadcasting, L.L.C.	Sports (FSR)
KIPI	93.5 FM	Eagle Butte	Cheyenne River Sioux Tribe	Variety
KIQK	104.1 FM	Rapid City	Haugo Broadcasting, Inc.	Country
KIXX	96.1 FM	Watertown	Alpha 3E License, LLC	Hot adult contemporary
KJAM	1390 AM	Madison	Christensen Broadcast Group, Inc.	Full service
KJBI	100.1 FM	Fort Pierre	James River Broadcasting Company, Inc.	Classic hits
KJCD-LP	92.9 FM	Pine Ridge	Restoration Radio Ministries, Inc.	Contemporary Christian
KJFP-LP	92.7 FM	Hot Springs	Joy Community Fellowship SBC	Religious Teaching
KJJQ	910 AM	Volga	Alpha 3E License, LLC	Classic country, Farm
KJKQ	99.5 FM	Sisseton	Prairie Winds Broadcasting, Inc.	Adult hits
KJKT	90.7 FM	Spearfish	Black Hills State University	Alternative
KJRC	89.9 FM	Rapid City	Real Presence Radio	Religious
KJRV	93.3 FM	Wessington Springs	Riverfront Broadcasting, LLC	Classic rock
KJSD	90.3 FM	Watertown	South Dakota Board of Directors for Educational Telecommunications	Public radio
KKLS	920 AM	Rapid City	Homeslice Media Group, LLC	Classic country
KKLS-FM	104.7 FM	Sioux Falls	Townsquare License, LLC	Contemporary hit radio
KKMK	93.9 FM	Rapid City	HomeSlice Media Group, LLC	Hot adult contemporary
KKQQ	102.3 FM	Volga	Alpha 3E License, LLC	Country
KKRC-FM	97.3 FM	Sioux Falls	Townsquare License, LLC	Classic hits
KKSD	104.3 FM	Milbank	Alpha 3E License, LLC	Classic hits
KKYA	93.1 FM	Yankton	Riverfront Broadcasting LLC	Country
KLMP	88.3 FM	Rapid City	University of Northwestern – St. Paul	Contemporary Inspirational
KLND	89.5 FM	Little Eagle	Seventh Generation Media Services, Inc.	Variety
KLRJ	94.9 FM	Aberdeen	Educational Media Foundation	Contemporary Christian
KLRK-FM	88.7 FM	Yankton	Educational Media Foundation	Contemporary Christian (K-Love)
KLXS-FM	95.3 FM	Pierre	Riverfront Broadcasting LLC	Country
KMIT	105.9 FM	Mitchell	Saga Communications of South Dakota, LLC	Country
KMLO	100.7 FM	Lowry	James River Broadcasting, Inc.	Country
KMOM	105.5 FM	Roscoe	Dakota Broadcasting, LLC	Country
KMSD	1510 AM	Milbank	Prairie Winds Broadcasting, Inc.	Classic hits
KMZM	103.1 FM	Madison	Christensen Broadcast Group, Inc.	Country
KNBZ	97.7 FM	Redfield	Prairie Winds Broadcasting, Inc.	Adult contemporary
KNWC	1270 AM	Sioux Falls	Northwestern College	Religious
KNWC-FM	96.5 FM	Sioux Falls	Northwestern College	Contemporary Christian
KOKK	1210 AM	Huron	Riverfront Broadcasting, LLC	Country
KOLY	1300 AM	Mobridge	James River Broadcasting Company	Classic Hits/News/Talk
KOLY-FM	99.5 FM	Mobridge	James River Broadcasting Company	Hot adult contemporary
KORN	1490 AM	Mitchell	Nedved Media, LLC	News Talk Information
KORN-FM	92.1 FM	Parkston	Nedved Media, LLC	Country
KOTA	1380 AM	Rapid City	Riverfront Broadcasting, LLC	News Talk Information
KOUT	98.7 FM	Rapid City	HomeSlice Media Group, LLC	Country
KOYA	88.1 FM	Rosebud	Rosebud Sioux Tribe	Community radio
KPGN-LP	105.1 FM	Pierre	Pierre Educational Radio, Inc.	Christian
KPGT	89.1 FM	Watertown	Harvest Community Baptist Church of Watertown, South Dakota	Religious
KPLO-FM	94.5 FM	Reliance	James River Broadcasting Company	Country
KPSD-FM	97.1 FM	Faith	South Dakota Board of Directors for Ed. Telecommunications	Public radio
KQKD	1380 AM	Redfield	Gray Ghost Broadcasting	Classic country
KQRN	107.3 FM	Mitchell	Nedved Media, LLC	Adult hits
KQRQ	92.3 FM	Rapid City	Riverfront Broadcasting, LLC	Classic hits
KQSD-FM	91.9 FM	Lowry	South Dakota Board of Directors for Ed. Telecommunications	Public radio
KQSF	101.9 FM	Sioux Falls	Midwest Communications, Inc.	Hot adult contemporary
KRCS	93.1 FM	Sturgis	HomeSlice Media Group, LLC	Contemporary hit radio
KRKI	99.5 FM	Keystone	Bad Lands Broadcasting Company, Inc.	Classic country
KRRO	103.7 FM	Sioux Falls	Midwest Communications, Inc.	Mainstream rock
KRSD	88.1 FM	Sioux Falls	Minnesota Public Radio	Classical
KRWH-LP	92.9 FM	Sioux Falls	Words of Hope Media	Religious
KSDJ	90.7 FM	Brookings	South Dakota State University	Alternative
KSDN	930 AM	Aberdeen	Prairie Winds Broadcasting, Inc.	News Talk Information
KSDN-FM	94.1 FM	Aberdeen	Prairie Winds Broadcasting, Inc.	Active rock
KSDR	1480 AM	Watertown	Alpha 3E License, LLC	News Talk Information
KSDR-FM	92.9 FM	Watertown	Alpha 3E License, LLC	Country
KSFS	90.1 FM	Sioux Falls	Educational Media Foundation	Religious
KSJP	88.9 FM	Ipswich	Real Presence Radio	Catholic
KSLP	90.3 FM	Fort Pierre	University of Northwestern – St. Paul	Contemporary Christian
KSLT	107.1 FM	Spearfish	University of Northwestern – St. Paul	Contemporary Christian
KSOO	1000 AM	Sioux Falls	Townsquare License, LLC	Sports (ESPN)
KSOO-FM	99.1 FM	Lennox	Townsquare License, LLC	Country
KSQY	95.1 FM	Deadwood	Haugo Broadcasting, Inc.	Mainstream rock
KSTJ	91.3 FM	Hartford	Real Presence Radio	Catholic
KTEQ-FM	91.3 FM	Rapid City	South Dakota School of Mines & Technology	Freeform/Alternative
KTOQ	1340 AM	Rapid City	Haugo Broadcasting, Inc.	Sports (ESPN)
KTSD-FM	91.1 FM	Reliance	South Dakota Board of Directors for Ed. Telecommunications	Public radio
KTWB	92.5 FM	Sioux Falls	Midwest Communications, Inc.	Country
KUQL	98.3 FM	Ethan	Saga Communications of South Dakota, LLC	Classic hits
KUSD	89.7 FM	Vermillion	South Dakota Board of Directors for Ed. Telecommunications	Public radio
KVAR	93.7 FM	Pine Ridge	Alleycat Communications	Classic rock
KVCF	90.5 FM	Freeman	VCY America, Inc.	Religious
KVCH	88.7 FM	Huron	VCY America Inc.	Religious
KVCX	101.5 FM	Gregory	VCY America, Inc.	Religious
KVFL	89.1 FM	Pierre	VCY America, Inc.	Religious
KVHT	106.3 FM	Vermillion	5 Star Communications Inc.	Classic hits
KVKR	88.7 FM	Pine Ridge	Southern Cultural Foundation	Classic rock
KVPC	97.9 FM	Rapid City	VCY America, Inc.	Christian
KVTK	1570 AM	Vermillion	5 Star Communications Inc.	Sports (ESPN/ISN)
KWAT	950 AM	Watertown	Alpha 3E License, LLC	News Talk Information
KWRC	90.9 FM	Hermosa	CSN International	Contemporary Christian
KWSD	89.1 FM	Mitchell	South Dakota Board of Directors for Ed. Telecommunications	Public radio
KWSN	1230 AM	Sioux Falls	Midwest Communications, Inc.	Sports (FSR)
KWYR	1260 AM	Winner	Midwest Radio Corp.	Country
KWYR-FM	93.7 FM	Winner	Midwest Radio Corp.	Classic rock
KXIN	100.9 FM	Wagner	Wayne L. Heeren	
KXLG	99.1 FM	Milbank	Dakota Communications	Soft adult contemporary
KXMZ	102.7 FM	Box Elder	Haugo Broadcasting, Inc.	Hot adult contemporary
KXRB	1140 AM	Sioux Falls	Townsquare License, LLC	Classic country
KXRB-FM	100.1 FM	Brandon	Townsquare License, LLC	Classic country
KXSW	89.9 FM	Sisseton	Corporation for Native Broadcasting	Community radio
KXZT	107.9 FM	Newell	Bad Lands Broadcasting Company, Inc.	Country
KYBB	102.7 FM	Canton	Townsquare License, LLC	Classic rock
KYNT	1450 AM	Yankton	Riverfront Broadcasting LLC	Soft adult contemporary
KYSD	91.9 FM	Spearfish	South Dakota Board of Directors for Ed. Telecommunications	Public radio
KZLK	106.3 FM	Rapid City	Riverfront Broadcasting, LLC	1980s' hits
KZMX	580 AM	Hot Springs	Mt. Rushmore Broadcasting, Inc.	Classic country
KZMX-FM	96.3 FM	Hot Springs	Mt. Rushmore Broadcasting, Inc.	Country
KZOY	1520 AM	Sioux Falls	Cup O' Dirt, LLC	1980s' hits
KZSD-FM	102.5 FM	Martin	South Dakota Board of Directors for Ed. Telecommunications	Public radio
KZZE-LP	96.5 FM	Fort Thompson	Crow Creek Sioux Tribe	Variety/Native American
KZZI	95.9 FM	Belle Fourche	Riverfront Broadcasting, LLC	Country
WNAX	570 AM	Yankton	Saga Communications of South Dakota, LLC	News Talk Information
WNAX-FM	104.1 FM	Yankton	Saga Communications of South Dakota, LLC	Country

== Defunct ==
- KABR
- KAWK
- WCAT
