= Hill City, South Dakota =

Hill City
- City
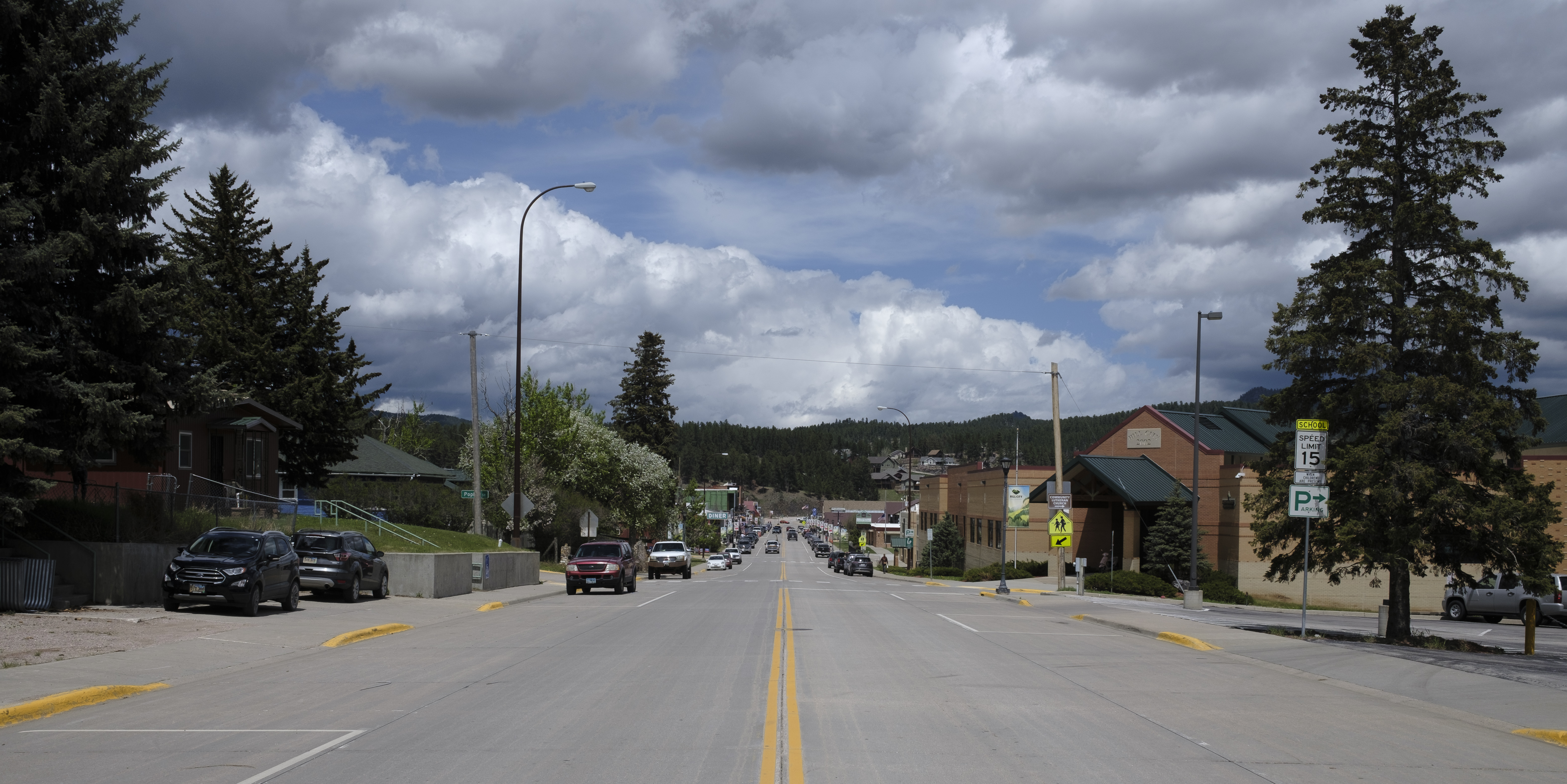
- Motto: The Heart of the Hills
- Location in Pennington County and the state of South Dakota
- Coordinates: 43°56′01″N 103°34′10″W
- Country: United States
- State: South Dakota
- County: Pennington
- Established: 1876
- Incorporated: 1945

Government
  - Type: Mayor-Council
  - Mayor: Kathy Skorzewski
  - Council President: Steve Jarvis

Area
  - Total: 1.32 sq mi (3.42 km^{2})
  - Land: 1.31 sq mi (3.40 km^{2})
  - Water: 0.0077 sq mi (0.02 km^{2})
- Elevation: 5,013 ft (1,528 m)

Population (2020)
  - Total: 872
  - Density: 664.7/sq mi (256.63/km^{2})
- Time zone: UTC−7 (MST)
  - Summer (DST): UTC−6 (MDT)
- Zip Code: 57745
- Area code: 605, NXX Exchange 574
- FIPS code: 46-29100
- GNIS feature ID: 1267423
- Website: City of Hill City

Hill City is the oldest existing city in Pennington County, South Dakota, United States. The population was 872 at the 2020 census, but as of 2024, the population is now over 1,000. Hill City is located 26 miles (42 km) southwest of Rapid City on U.S. Highway 16 and on U.S. Route 385 that connects Deadwood to Hot Springs. Hill City is known as the "Heart of the Hills", a distinction derived from its proximity to both the geographical center of the Black Hills, and the local tourist destinations. Near Hill City, there is a monumental peak dating back hundreds of years. Black Elk Peak was once on reservation lands where many Native people used to hunt and gather but they also used it as a prayer location.

The city has its roots in the Black Hills mining rush of the late 19th century. Tin mining was dominant in the 1880s and led to an influx of capital and people into the area. As the mining industry waned, tourism and timber became increasingly important industries to the area. The creation of Mount Rushmore National Memorial and Crazy Horse Memorial led to an increase in awareness of the Black Hills as a tourist destination. Custer State Park and the Sturgis Motorcycle Rally also draw visitors to Hill City. In recent years, the city has diversified to become a center for the arts in the area, featuring several art studios and festivals.

== History ==
Human history in the area that became Hill City, and the greater Black Hills in particular, started by at least 7000 BC. The Arikara arrived by 1500 AD, followed by the Cheyenne, Crow, Kiowa and Pawnee. In the 19th century, the Lakota Sioux claimed the land, calling it Paha Sapa. In 1874, Major General George Armstrong Custer led an expedition into the Black Hills, during which gold was discovered in French Creek, 13 miles (21 km) south of Hill City. The discovery of gold opened the Black Hills, and the Hill City area, to mining. Hill City was first settled by miners in 1876, who referred to the area as Hillyo. This was the second American settlement in the Black Hills. Hill City is the oldest city still in existence in Pennington County. A post office was constructed and opened on November 26, 1877. The city almost became a ghost town when miners relocated to the northern Black Hills after the discovery of gold there.

In 1883, tin was discovered near Hill City, and the population rebounded. The Harney Peak Tin Mining, Milling, and Manufacturing Company made its headquarters on Main Street. The company was backed by English financiers and bought 1,100 prospecting sites around the area. As mining grew, the city became known for its wild living and was once referred to as "a town with a church on each end and a mile of Hell in between." At one time, 15 saloons were located on Main Street. The company built the Harney Peak Hotel on Main Street to entertain its management and executives. Upon realizing the tin market was unsustainable, the company ceased operation in 1902.

Although a small school building was established previously, a main school building was constructed on Main Street in 1921. This school building was replaced in 2001 with the current high school. On July 10, 1939, a fire started 10 miles (16 km) outside of Hill City. Among those who battled the blaze was Hill City High School's entire basketball squad, as well as several teachers and administrators. The United States Forest Service named the school boys one of the best crews who fought the fire. The school team name thus became the Hill City Rangers and was privileged as the only school district in the United States allowed to use Smokey Bear as its official mascot. Hill City was incorporated on March 21, 1945. The Harney Peak Hotel remained in operation until 1934. The building has been restored and is the current location of the Alpine Inn. This building is on the List of Registered Historic Places in South Dakota. The Black Hills Institute of Geological Research opened in 1973 and is involved in the excavation and display of dinosaur and other fossils. In 1992, the institute was engaged in a legal battle over ownership of the Tyrannosaurus rex fossil named "Sue".

This city was one of the filming locations for TNT's 1994 film Lakota Woman: Siege at Wounded Knee.

=== Railroad ===
The State Railroad Museum in Hill City

The main railroad lines that intersected Hill City were the Burlington Northern Line (also called the High Line), previously the Grand Island and Wyoming Central, operated by the Chicago, Burlington and Quincy Railroad Company; and the Black Hills Central Line, a spur that extended from Hill City to Keystone. The High Line extended from Edgemont north through Hill City and terminated in Deadwood. This line reached Hill City in 1893, and the Black Hills Central Line was extended and reached Keystone on January 20, 1900. Narrow gauge trolley cars were operated at 45-minute intervals during the day on the High Line. The High Line discontinued its passenger service in 1949 and was fully abandoned in 1983. It is now the George S. Mickelson Trail, after being converted to a bike trail during the 1990s.

"1880 Train" in Hill City

In 1957, the Black Hills Central Railroad, also known locally as the 1880 Train, opened a tourist passenger train on the Black Hills Central Line. In 1972, a flood destroyed the last mile of the Burlington Northern and Black Hills Central Lines that extended from Hill City to Keystone. This final mile was restored in 2001. The Black Hills Central Railroad restores era-style locomotives and train cars. It has been featured on television shows such as the Gunsmoke episode "Snow Train", General Hospital, and the TNT mini-series Into the West. The railroad also made an appearance in the movie Orphan Train.

=== Sue controversy ===
Black Hills Institute of Geological Research

On August 12, 1990, Sue Hendrickson, a volunteer for the Black Hills Institute of Geological Research discovered the fossil of what would become the most complete skeleton of a Tyrannosaurus rex ever discovered. The fossil was named "Sue" after the woman who discovered it. After discovery, excavation, and transport to the institute's facilities in Hill City, controversy arose as to who the rightful owners of the fossil were. The parties in dispute were the land owner, Maurice Williams; the tribe, and thus the federal government; and the Black Hills Institute. On May 12, 1992, FBI agents seized Sue from the institute over the course of three days. The fossil was shipped to South Dakota School of Mines and Technology. Through the ongoing court battle, it was finally decided that Maurice Williams was the owner of the fossil. The federal government later brought a 39-count, 153-charge indictment against the institute and several of its members, which was related to this case and other fossils. This case turned into the longest criminal trial in South Dakota state history. Peter Larson, the president of the institute, was convicted on two counts of customs violations, for which he served two years in federal prison. Sue was finally auctioned off by Sotheby's auction house and sold by Maurice Williams to the Field Museum in Chicago, Illinois for $8.36 million.

== Geography and climate ==
Hill City is located in the Black Hills near the geographic center of the Black Hills, which is where the cities motto "The Heart of the Hills" originated. Spring Creek and Newton Fork run through the east side of town.

According to the United States Census Bureau, the city has a total area of 1.27 square miles (3.29 km^{2}), of which 1.26 square miles (3.26 km^{2}) is land and 0.01 square miles (0.03 km^{2}) is water.

The climate of Hill City is dry, with an average of 20 inches (510 mm) of precipitation annually. The presence of the hills surrounding the town leads to cooler weather in winter and summer and makes for calm conditions with little wind compared to areas outside of the Black Hills. The Köppen climate type of this location is Dwb, often described as the dry-winter version of the Warm Summer Humid Continental climate. Climates that feature a winter dry season like this one are rare in non-tropical areas of the United States, with appearances limited to isolated areas of the Great Plains states.

Climate data for Hill City, South Dakota (1991–2020 normals, extremes 1968–present)
Month	Jan	Feb	Mar	Apr	May	Jun	Jul	Aug	Sep	Oct	Nov	Dec	Year
Record high °F (°C)	74 (23)	70 (21)	77 (25)	85 (29)	90 (32)	99 (37)	101 (38)	101 (38)	98 (37)	89 (32)	78 (26)	71 (22)	101 (38)
Mean maximum °F (°C)	59.8 (15.4)	59.2 (15.1)	67.4 (19.7)	74.4 (23.6)	82.5 (28.1)	89.4 (31.9)	93.0 (33.9)	91.7 (33.2)	88.2 (31.2)	79.1 (26.2)	67.7 (19.8)	58.9 (14.9)	94.3 (34.6)
Mean daily maximum °F (°C)	40.5 (4.7)	40.8 (4.9)	49.0 (9.4)	55.8 (13.2)	64.8 (18.2)	75.4 (24.1)	82.8 (28.2)	81.8 (27.7)	73.8 (23.2)	59.8 (15.4)	48.6 (9.2)	40.7 (4.8)	59.5 (15.3)
Daily mean °F (°C)	25.1 (−3.8)	25.5 (−3.6)	34.0 (1.1)	41.1 (5.1)	50.7 (10.4)	60.3 (15.7)	66.7 (19.3)	65.0 (18.3)	56.2 (13.4)	43.8 (6.6)	33.2 (0.7)	25.4 (−3.7)	43.9 (6.6)
Mean daily minimum °F (°C)	9.6 (−12.4)	10.1 (−12.2)	19.1 (−7.2)	26.3 (−3.2)	36.6 (2.6)	45.2 (7.3)	50.7 (10.4)	48.3 (9.1)	38.5 (3.6)	27.9 (−2.3)	17.8 (−7.9)	10.2 (−12.1)	28.4 (−2.0)
Mean minimum °F (°C)	−14.7 (−25.9)	−14.3 (−25.7)	−4.5 (−20.3)	8.4 (−13.1)	21.4 (−5.9)	32.2 (0.1)	39.5 (4.2)	36.6 (2.6)	24.3 (−4.3)	8.5 (−13.1)	−3.7 (−19.8)	−12.9 (−24.9)	−23.8 (−31.0)
Record low °F (°C)	−34 (−37)	−38 (−39)	−25 (−32)	−9 (−23)	14 (−10)	26 (−3)	30 (−1)	27 (−3)	12 (−11)	−21 (−29)	−19 (−28)	−39 (−39)	−39 (−39)
Average precipitation inches (mm)	0.40 (10)	0.65 (17)	1.12 (28)	2.46 (62)	4.15 (105)	3.43 (87)	3.55 (90)	2.34 (59)	1.54 (39)	1.65 (42)	0.59 (15)	0.49 (12)	22.37 (568)
Average snowfall inches (cm)	6.1 (15)	8.7 (22)	11.6 (29)	13.8 (35)	4.1 (10)	0.3 (0.76)	0.0 (0.0)	0.0 (0.0)	1.0 (2.5)	6.5 (17)	7.5 (19)	7.0 (18)	66.6 (169)
Average extreme snow depth inches (cm)	4.5 (11)	5.6 (14)	6.2 (16)	6.2 (16)	1.6 (4.1)	0.1 (0.25)	0.0 (0.0)	0.0 (0.0)	0.8 (2.0)	3.7 (9.4)	4.6 (12)	4.7 (12)	11.8 (30)
Average precipitation days (≥ 0.01 in)	5.1	6.6	7.4	10.8	14.3	12.4	12.2	10.1	7.6	7.8	5.0	5.1	104.4
Average snowy days (≥ 0.1 in)	4.8	6.0	5.7	5.3	1.2	0.1	0.0	0.0	0.4	2.1	4.0	4.7	34.3
Source: NOAA

== Demographics ==
Historical population
Census	Pop.	Note	%±
1890	479		—
1900	602		25.7%
1910	271		−55.0%
1920	443		63.5%
1950	361		—
1960	419		16.1%
1970	389		−7.2%
1980	535		37.5%
1990	650		21.5%
2000	780		20.0%
2010	948		21.5%
2020	872		−8.0%
U.S. Decennial Census

=== 2020 census ===
As of the 2020 census, Hill City had a population of 872. The median age was 43.6 years. 23.5% of residents were under the age of 18 and 20.2% of residents were 65 years of age or older. For every 100 females there were 97.3 males, and for every 100 females age 18 and over there were 97.3 males age 18 and over.

0.0% of residents lived in urban areas, while 100.0% lived in rural areas.

There were 388 households in Hill City, of which 29.9% had children under the age of 18 living in them. Of all households, 50.8% were married-couple households, 19.8% were households with a male householder and no spouse or partner present, and 23.7% were households with a female householder and no spouse or partner present. About 33.0% of all households were made up of individuals and 13.2% had someone living alone who was 65 years of age or older.

There were 481 housing units, of which 19.3% were vacant. The homeowner vacancy rate was 0.0% and the rental vacancy rate was 6.5%.

Racial composition as of the 2020 census
Race	Number	Percent
White	642	73.6%
Black or African American	6	0.7%
American Indian and Alaska Native	35	4.0%
Asian	6	0.7%
Native Hawaiian and Other Pacific Islander	0	0.0%
Some other race	87	10.0%
Two or more races	96	11.0%
Hispanic or Latino (of any race)	161	18.5%

=== 2010 census ===
As of the census of 2010 there were 1008 people, 394 households, and 244 families residing in the city. The population density was 752.4 inhabitants per square mile (290.5/km^{2}). There were 473 housing units at an average density of 375.4 per square mile (144.9/km^{2}). The racial makeup of the city was 82.1% White, 0.6% African American, 4.0% Native American, 0.1% Asian, 10.4% from other races, and 2.7% from two or more races. Hispanic or Latino of any race were 18.9% of the population.

There were 394 households, of which 33.0% had children under the age of 18 living with them, 49.2% were married couples living together, 7.9% had a female householder with no husband present, 4.8% had a male householder with no wife present, and 38.1% were non-families. 30.7% of all households were made up of individuals, and 9.7% had someone living alone who was 65 years of age or older. The average household size was 2.41 and the average family size was 3.05.

The median age in the city was 37.9 years. 25.8% of residents were under the age of 18; 8.7% were between the ages of 18 and 24; 24.7% were from 25 to 44; 27.6% were from 45 to 64; and 13.4% were 65 years of age or older. The gender makeup of the city was 51.2% male and 48.8% female.

=== 2000 census ===
As of the census of 2000, there were 780 people, 298 households, and 213 families residing in the city. The population density was 1,013.5 inhabitants per square mile (391.3/km^{2}). There were 340 housing units at an average density of 441.8 per square mile (170.6/km^{2}). The racial makeup of the city was 89.74% White, 3.46% Native American, 0.26% Asian, 4.36% from other races, and 2.18% from two or more races. Hispanic or Latino of any race were 7.05% of the population.

There were 298 households, out of which 39.3% had children under the age of 18 living with them, 52.3% were married couples living together, 13.1% had a female householder with no husband present, and 28.2% were non-families. 24.5% of all households were made up of individuals, and 7.4% had someone living alone who was 65 years of age or older. The average household size was 2.62 and the average family size was 3.11.

In the city, the population was spread out, with 31.2% under the age of 18, 7.6% from 18 to 24, 30.3% from 25 to 44, 20.4% from 45 to 64, and 10.6% who were 65 years of age or older. The median age was 35 years. For every 100 females, there were 94.0 males. For every 100 females age 18 and over, there were 85.8 males.

The median income for a household in the city was $32,500, and the median income for a family was $37,500. Males had a median income of $30,114 versus $17,000 for females. The per capita income for the city was $15,789. About 12.5% of families and 13.7% of the population were below the poverty line, including 17.5% of those under age 18 and 13.3% of those age 65 or over.

== Government and services ==
Hill City incorporates a Mayor-Council style of governance in which the mayor is the chief executor and the council has legislative control over city ordinances. The city is broken into two wards with two members of the city council elected from each ward to serve two-year terms. Mayor Don Voorhees was elected to his first term in 2006 and will serve a four-year term. Dave Gray is the president of the council and represents the first ward. Mr. Gray has served on the council since 1998 and was re-elected in 2006. The second representative from the first ward is Tana Nichols who was first elected in 2001 and re-elected in 2005. Ward II is represented by John Johnson who was first elected in 2003 and re-elected in 2005, and Dan Maxfield who was elected to his first term in 2006.

Members of the Zoning and Planning Commission, Parks Board, and Library Board are appointed. There are five members on the zoning and planning commission with the chair and vice-chair being elected positions. The city's financial officer administrates city offices, council activities, mayoral activities, department and personnel management, while also acting as financial control of city assets, budgets, and fiscal activities. The major source of city income is through a sales tax. The office of Public Works oversees city infrastructure, water and sewers.

In the South Dakota State Legislature, Hill City is represented by two representatives and one senator from District 30 who all serve two-year terms corresponding to even numbered years. The district encompasses all of Fall River County, Custer County, and most of Pennington country excluding most of the Rapid City area in the north central part of the county. The senator is Bruce Rampelberg, a second-term Republican from Rapid City. The representatives are Lance Russell, a third-term Republican from Hot Springs, and Mike Verchio, a third-term Republican from Hill City.

Hill City has a voluntary ambulance service and voluntary fire department. There is one health clinic in town with limited services. Rapid City Regional hospital (26 miles away) and Custer community hospital (13 miles away) both offer emergency room and other health facilities. There is a small library in town with a collection of 7,338 books and various audio and visual resources. The Pennington Country Sheriff's Department has allocated three deputies to serve the Hill City area.

== Economy ==
Employment in Hill City is based on the timber, tourism, and telecommunications industries.

The timber industry is important to Hill City since it is located in the Black Hills National Forest. Rushmore Forest Products used to operate a lumber mill outside of town and was the area's largest employer until it closed down in 2021.

Tourism is enabled by Hill City's proximity to Mount Rushmore, Crazy Horse Memorial, Custer State Park, and the Sturgis Motorcycle Rally. There are hundreds of tourist attractions along the 56 mile stretch from Custer SD to Lead-Deadwood SD including a ski lodge and an early gold mill, These 56 miles are what keeps tourism alive in western South Dakota. Several local attractions, restaurants, souvenir shops, and art galleries cater to those visiting the area.

RMA & Associates, a telecommunications company responsible for telephone surveying, has a call center in Hill City.

Hill City has increasingly become the arts community of the Black Hills, and is the home to the Warrior's Work gallery, which features both Indian art and art reflecting the West, Black Hills Bronze, and the home gallery of well-known local painter Jon Crane. It is also the home of Art of the Hills magazine, which focuses on the art and artists of the region.

Hill City collects a 2% sales tax on general merchandise, and an additional 1% on lodging, restaurants, alcohol, and ticket sales. Hill City does not tax income on business or individuals.

== Education ==
Hill City School District 51-2, the area school district, is made up of elementary, middle, and high schools located in separate buildings on the same campus. A permanent school building was constructed in 1921 and housed all grades until an elementary school building was constructed in 1961 with several modifications in the 1980s. The Middle School was built in the 1970s with several additions in the 1990s. After the middle school was built the original school building became the high school building. In 2001, construction was begun on a new high school which was completed in 2002. The previous high school was razed in 2003. Hill City District 51-2 schools are predominantly funded through property tax on those living in the school district. The district also has adopted an open enrollment policy that makes it easier to transfer between local school districts.

Enrollment as of the 2010–2011 school year was 506, while the majority live outside the city limits. The school also serves the town of Keystone, South Dakota, and the unincorporated towns of Rochford, and Silver City. The school system is administered by a board of education which as of the 2010–2011 school year, was made up of President Owen Wiederhold and members Cydnee Gruzenski, Kris Knapp, Darrell Sullivan and Michelle Anderson. The school's superintendent is Blake Gardner. The high school principal is Todd Satter, the middle school principal is Joe Noyes, and the 2025 elementary principal is Samantha Weaver.

The Hill City Schools made AYP under the No Child Left Behind Act at every grade level and at every subgroup. South Dakota school districts use the Dakota Step Test as its assessment tool. The upcoming year, 79% of students will be required to be proficient in reading and 72% in math.

== Culture and religion ==
Hill City is becoming a center for the Black Hills visual arts community. The Hill City Arts Council oversees the promotion of the arts in the city, as well as several arts events throughout the year including the annual Art Extravaganza put on by the local artists and Arts and Crafts fair which draws more regional influence. An annual quilt show and Native American quilt show are also offered. There are seven art studios and galleries in town with several regionally known artists. Styles highlighted are sculpture in bronze and stone, watercolors, painting, and framing. Native American artwork and jewelry are also prominent.

The Hill City Slickers is a musical group that plays country, folk, and bluegrass music as well as original music. In 2003 they were featured artists with the Black Hills Symphony Orchestra. Thus far they have produced three albums.

Hill City is home to the Black Hills Museum of Natural History, which came out of the vision of the Black Hills Institute for Geological Research. The museum was incorporated in 1992. The collection on display includes dinosaurs, fossil fishes, mammals, birds, reptiles, and fossil invertebrates, as well as gemstones, minerals, and meteorites. The highlight of the collection is the Tyrannosaurus rex specimen named "Stan" which is one of the most compete skeletons unearthed with 65% of the bones unearthed. The museum is also a leading contributor to Hill City's Natural History Days celebration that focuses on fun and education, with guest speakers, and a fossil hunt for children.

Wade's Gold Mill and Mining Museum offers a look back on the history of mining in the Black Hills. The museum has worked to collect and preserve equipment used of mining in the Black Hills and hosts a one-stamp gold mill.

Although people of many faiths live in Hill City, five groups have established church buildings in town. These include Assemblies of God, Catholic Church, Lutheran Church–Missouri Synod, Evangelical Lutheran Church in America, and one non-denominational Christian church.

== Sports and recreation ==
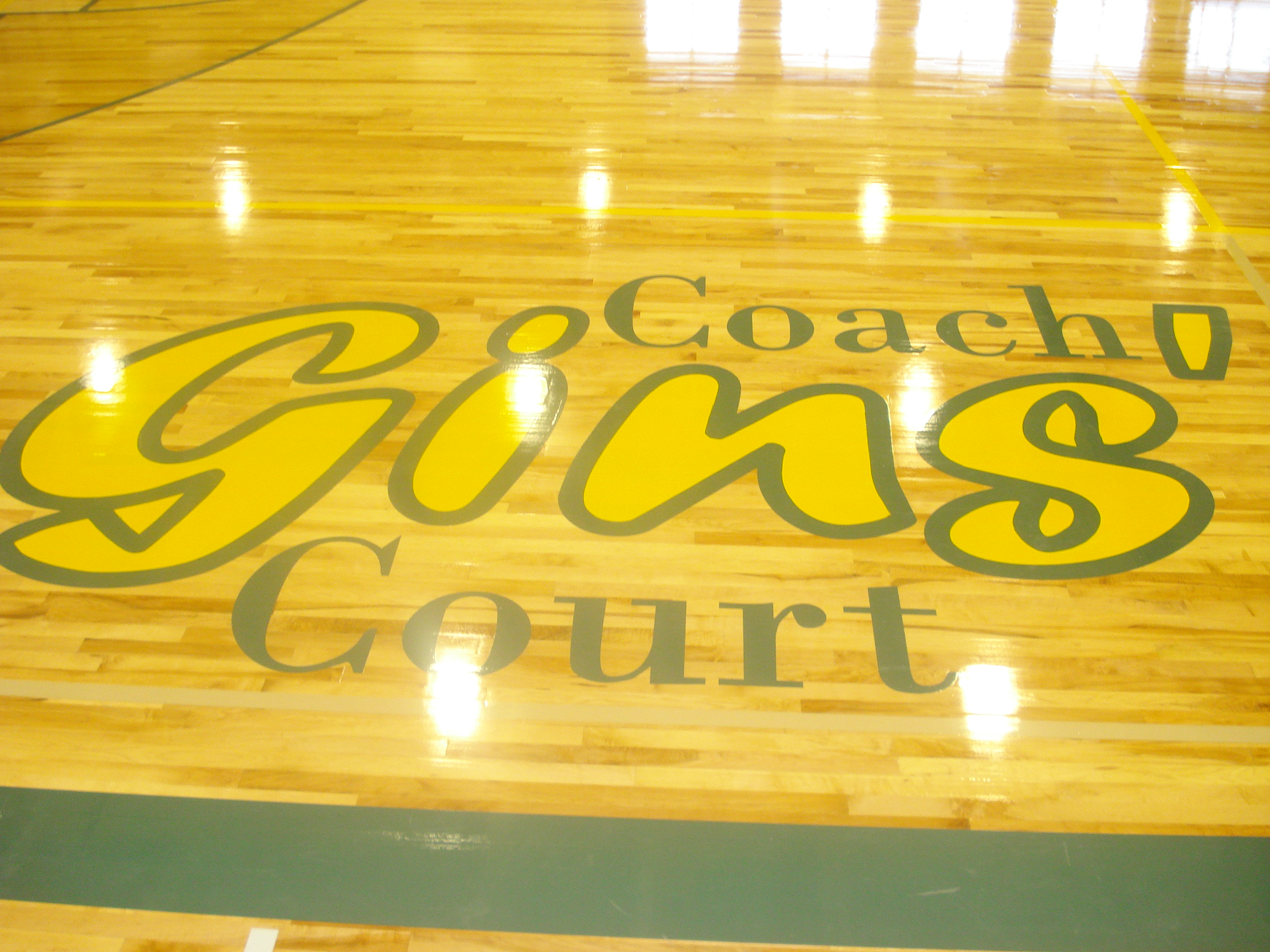
Coach Gins Court in Hill City, SD. Home to the Rangers.

Hill City High School is a member of the South Dakota High School Activities Association and competes in class "A". Because students helped to fight a wildfire that threatened the community in 1939, the school's mascot is Smokey Bear, and the fight song is Marines' Hymn. High School Boys compete in basketball, football, track and field, cross country, and wrestling. High School Girls compete in basketball, volleyball, cheerleading, track and field, cross country, and golf. The school also provides a choir, band, and theatre department.

Outdoor Sports popular in the area include hiking, mountain climbing, snowmobiling, and dogsled racing. Hill City is the ninth trailhead on the George S. Mickelson Trail that runs from Deadwood, to Edgemont. This trail is often used for running, cycling, and snowmobiling in the winter.

Snowmobiling is also enjoyed in the area with groomed paths running through Hill City and the surrounding Black Hills. There are 350 miles (560 km) of groomed trails in the area. Two snowmobiling magazines have rated the Black Hills as one of the best places to ride in North America.

== Notable people ==
- Frank Henderson, jurist and state legislator
- Jonathan Karl, American politician; ABC News Washington Correspondent; raised in Hill City.
- Watson Parker, historian specializing in the history of the Black Hills; raised on a ranch near Hill City.

== Area Media ==
The television and radio stations available in Hill City are generally based out of the Rapid City market. Hill City does have one FM station, 103.9 K280AJ, which is a translator station of KRCS Sturgis.

- Television
  - KHME 3 ABC
  - KOTA-TV 7 Fox
  - KBHE-TV 9 PBS
  - KNBN 21 NBC
- FM Radio
  - 89.3 KBHE SDPB/NPR (Public/Classical/Jazz)
  - 92.3 KQRQ-FM "Q 92.3" (Classic hits)
  - 93.1/99.5 KRCS "Hot 93.1" (Top 40/CHR)
  - 93.9 KKMK "Magic 93.9" (Adult contemporary)
  - 95.1 KSQY "K-Sky" (Mainstream Rock)
  - 97.9/105.7 KVPC "VCY America" (Christian)
  - 98.7 KOUT "Kat Country" (Country)
  - 100.3 KFXS "The Fox" (Classic rock)
  - 103.9 K280AJ (Adult contemporary)
  - 104.1 KIQK "Kick 104" (Country)
  - 106.3 KZLK "Max FM" (Adult hits)
- AM Radio
  - 810 KBHB Sturgis
  - 920 KKLS Rapid City
  - 980 KDSJ Deadwood
  - 1150 KIMM Rapid City
  - 1340 KTOQ Rapid City
  - 1380 KOTA Rapid City
- Print

The Hill City Prevailer is a weekly newspaper covering local issues in Hill City and Keystone. Founded in 1970, the paper is published by Southern Hills Publishing Inc. and has a circulation of 850.

Art of the Hills Magazine is a bi-annual publication focusing on visual and performing arts and creative writing in Hill City and the Black Hills.
