= Spearfish, South Dakota =

Spearfish, South Dakota Hočhápȟe
- City
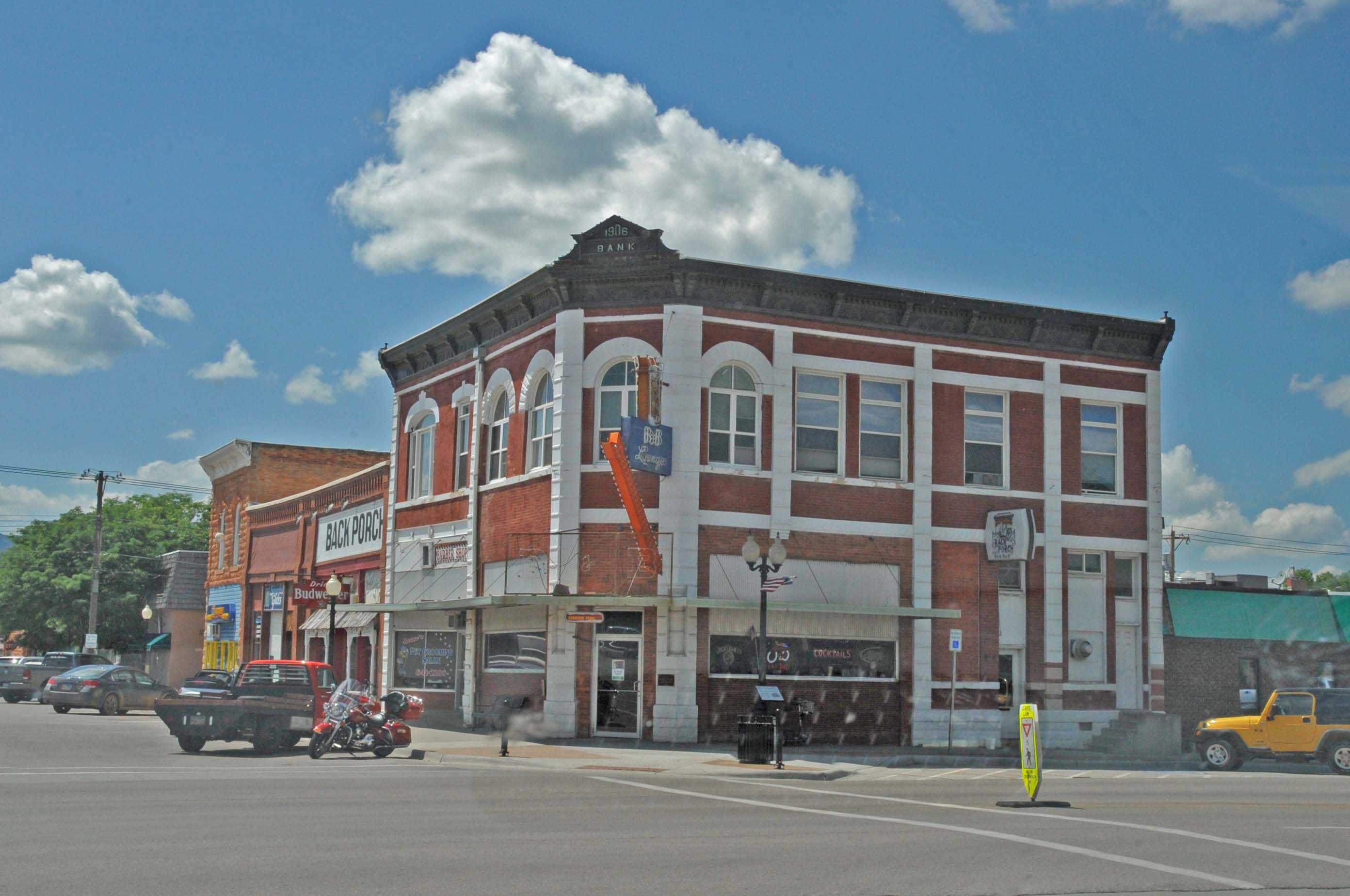
- Historic commercial district of Spearfish
- Nickname: Queen City
- Location of Spearfish, South Dakota
- Coordinates: 44.491431°N 103.816297°W
- Country: United States
- State: South Dakota
- County: Lawrence
- Founded: 1876
- Incorporated: July 21, 1888

Government
  - Mayor: John Senden
  - City Council: Ward 1: Jamie Hafner & Marty Clark; Ward 2: Larry Klarenbeek & Scott Hourigan; Ward 3: Ana Rath & Pam Jacobs

Area
  - City: 17.275 sq mi (44.742 km^{2})
  - Land: 17.270 sq mi (44.729 km^{2})
  - Water: 0.0050 sq mi (0.0129 km^{2}) 0.03%
- Elevation: 3,921 ft (1,195 m)

Population (2020)
  - City: 12,193
  - Estimate (2024): 13,803
  - Density: 799/sq mi (308.6/km^{2})
  - Urban: 13,206
  - Metro: 28,809 (US: 449th)
  - Combined: 185,036 (US: 149th)
- Time zone: UTC–7 (Mountain (MST))
  - Summer (DST): UTC–6 (MDT)
- ZIP Codes: 57783, 57799
- Area code: 605
- FIPS code: 46-60020
- GNIS feature ID: 1267588
- Sales tax: 6.2%
- Website: spearfish.gov

Spearfish (Lakota: Hočhápȟe) is a city in Lawrence County, South Dakota, United States. The population was 12,193 at the 2020 census, and was estimated to be 13,803 in 2024, making it the 10th most populous city in South Dakota. Spearfish is the largest city in Lawrence County and the home of Black Hills State University.

== History ==
Before the Black Hills Gold Rush of 1876, the area was used by Native Americans (primarily bands of Sioux but others also ranged through the area). Once the gold rush started, the city was founded in 1876 at the mouth of Spearfish Canyon, and was originally called Queen City. Spearfish grew as a supplier of foodstuffs to the mining camps in the hills. Even today, a significant amount of truck farming and market gardening still occurs in the vicinity.

In 1887, the accepted history of gold mining in the Black Hills was thrown into question by the discovery of what has become known as the Thoen Stone. Discovered by Louis Thoen on Lookout Mountain, the stone purports to be the last testament of Ezra Kind who, along with six others, entered the Black Hills in 1833, "got all the gold we could carry" in June 1834, and were subsequently "killed by Indians beyond the high hill." There is corroborating historical evidence for the Ezra Kind party.

In the 20th century, the history of Spearfish was tied to mining and tourism. Architect Frank Lloyd Wright, who visited Spearfish Canyon in 1935, later called the area "unique and unparalleled elsewhere in our country," and wondered, "How is it that I've heard so little of this miracle and we, toward the Atlantic, have heard so much of the Grand Canyon when this is even more miraculous?"

The Homestake Sawmill (previously part of Pope and Talbot, now owned by Neimen Forest Products) was built to supply timbers for the Homestake Mine in Lead (closed January 2002). In 1938, Joseph Meier brought the Luenen Passion Play to settle permanently in Spearfish and become the Black Hills Passion Play, drawing thousands of visitors every year during the summer months. After Meier's death in 2007, the amphitheater and 23 acres (93,000 m^{2}) surrounding it were put up for sale.

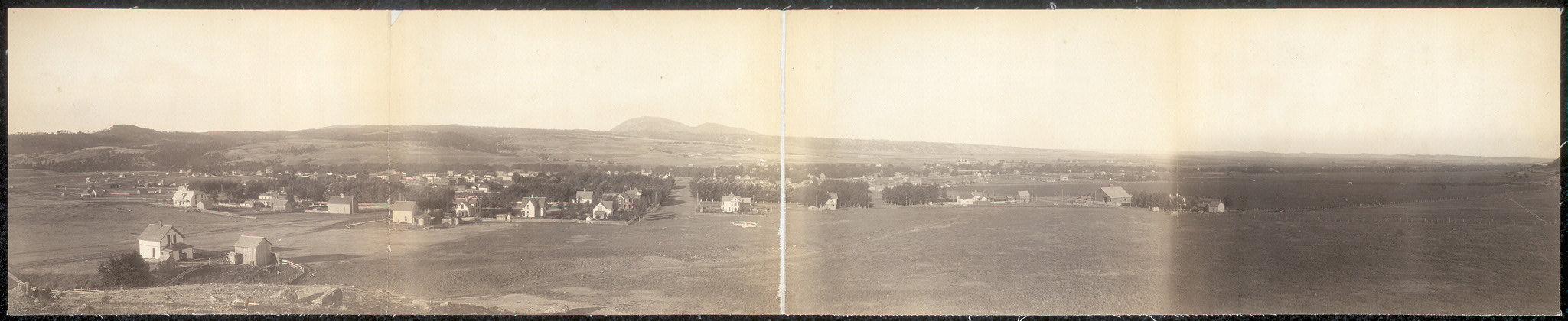
Panoramic view of Spearfish in 1902.

== Geography ==
According to the United States Census Bureau, the city has a total area of 17.275 square miles (44.74 km^{2}), of which 17.270 square miles (44.73 km^{2}) is land and 0.005 square miles (0.013 km^{2}) (0.03%) is water.

Situated at the northern edge of the Black Hills, Spearfish is frequently nicknamed the "Queen City" because of the "crown" of mountains ringing it; the three most famous and prominent of these is Lookout Mountain (elevation 4,452 ft) which abuts the city on its east, Crow Peak (elevation 5760 ft) which sits approximately halfway between Spearfish and the Wyoming state line in the west, and Spearfish Peak (elevation 5798 ft), which is the most prominent peak when facing south from town.

Spearfish Creek is a fast-moving creek that emerges from Spearfish Canyon at Spearfish. It runs roughly south to north through the center of town (parallel to Canyon Street), year round. The creek freezes from the bottom up instead of icing over. This unusual phenomenon occurs due to the very fast rate at which the creek flows. This speed prevents ice from forming except along the bottom of the creek bed where friction and turbulence allow the water to slow down long enough to freeze. Since the creek continues to flow atop this ice, the water level of the creek gradually rises as more ice accumulates on the bottom, in some cases causing flooding on the north side of town where the channel is not as deep.

== Climate ==
Given its location at the base of the Black Hills and its proximity to the High Plains, the climate in Spearfish is highly variable at any time of the year, a phenomenon especially apparent in the winter months. According to the Köppen climate classification, Spearfish has humid continental climate (Dfb). Snow depth is limited: even in winter half of all days have no snow on the ground, although on average 70.5 inches or 1.8 meters of snow falls annually.

Climate data for Spearfish, South Dakota (1991–2020 normals; extremes 1893–present)
Month	Jan	Feb	Mar	Apr	May	Jun	Jul	Aug	Sep	Oct	Nov	Dec	Year
Record high °F (°C)	79 (26)	75 (24)	82 (28)	91 (33)	96 (36)	105 (41)	110 (43)	104 (40)	105 (41)	95 (35)	85 (29)	73 (23)	110 (43)
Mean maximum °F (°C)	59.7 (15.4)	59.9 (15.5)	69.8 (21.0)	78.8 (26.0)	85.0 (29.4)	93.4 (34.1)	98.1 (36.7)	96.7 (35.9)	93.1 (33.9)	82.1 (27.8)	68.0 (20.0)	60.2 (15.7)	100.0 (37.8)
Mean daily maximum °F (°C)	35.9 (2.2)	36.9 (2.7)	45.8 (7.7)	54.9 (12.7)	64.3 (17.9)	75.3 (24.1)	83.6 (28.7)	82.9 (28.3)	74.0 (23.3)	58.1 (14.5)	45.9 (7.7)	37.2 (2.9)	57.9 (14.4)
Daily mean °F (°C)	25.8 (−3.4)	26.6 (−3.0)	35.0 (1.7)	43.5 (6.4)	53.1 (11.7)	63.3 (17.4)	70.6 (21.4)	69.5 (20.8)	60.8 (16.0)	46.8 (8.2)	35.7 (2.1)	27.3 (−2.6)	46.5 (8.1)
Mean daily minimum °F (°C)	15.7 (−9.1)	16.3 (−8.7)	24.2 (−4.3)	32.0 (0.0)	41.8 (5.4)	51.3 (10.7)	57.6 (14.2)	56.1 (13.4)	47.6 (8.7)	35.4 (1.9)	25.6 (−3.6)	17.5 (−8.1)	35.1 (1.7)
Mean minimum °F (°C)	−7.7 (−22.1)	−4.8 (−20.4)	3.6 (−15.8)	17.9 (−7.8)	30.7 (−0.7)	43.0 (6.1)	50.4 (10.2)	47.1 (8.4)	36.0 (2.2)	18.5 (−7.5)	4.9 (−15.1)	−4.3 (−20.2)	−14.4 (−25.8)
Record low °F (°C)	−32 (−36)	−33 (−36)	−27 (−33)	−8 (−22)	11 (−12)	25 (−4)	33 (1)	32 (0)	15 (−9)	−7 (−22)	−23 (−31)	−30 (−34)	−33 (−36)
Average precipitation inches (mm)	0.60 (15)	0.91 (23)	1.19 (30)	2.23 (57)	3.72 (94)	3.51 (89)	2.35 (60)	1.88 (48)	1.56 (40)	2.04 (52)	0.70 (18)	0.72 (18)	21.41 (544)
Average snowfall inches (cm)	8.2 (21)	12.7 (32)	12.0 (30)	8.5 (22)	2.3 (5.8)	0.0 (0.0)	0.0 (0.0)	0.0 (0.0)	0.1 (0.25)	5.5 (14)	6.3 (16)	14.9 (38)	70.5 (179)
Average precipitation days (≥ 0.01 in)	6.7	6.8	6.4	9.0	11.8	12.3	9.4	7.1	5.9	7.1	5.2	5.0	92.7
Average snowy days (≥ 0.1 in)	5.1	4.6	3.3	2.1	0.4	0.0	0.0	0.0	0.1	1.3	3.1	4.3	24.3
Source: NOAA

=== World record temperature change ===
Spearfish holds the world record for the fastest recorded temperature change. On January 22, 1943, at 7:30 a.m. MST, the temperature in Spearfish was −4 °F (−20 °C). A chinook wind picked up speed rapidly, and two minutes later (7:32 a.m.) the temperature was +45 °F (7 °C). The 49 °F or 27 °C rise in two minutes set a world record that still holds. By 9:00 a.m., the temperature had risen to 54 °F (12 °C). Suddenly, the Chinook died down and the temperature tumbled back to −4 °F or −20 °C. The 58 °F or 32.2 °C drop took only 27 minutes. The sudden change in temperatures caused glass windows to crack and windshields to instantly frost over.

Extreme winter maxima in the district are remarkably warm given the latitude and altitude; on January 19, 1921, Spearfish reached a temperature of 79 °F (26 °C), the hottest January temperature in South Dakota on record.

== Demographics ==
Historical population
Census	Pop.	Note	%±
1880	170		—
1890	678		298.8%
1900	1,166		72.0%
1910	1,130		−3.1%
1920	1,254		11.0%
1930	1,577		25.8%
1940	2,139		35.6%
1950	2,755		28.8%
1960	3,682		33.6%
1970	4,661		26.6%
1980	5,251		12.7%
1990	6,966		32.7%
2000	8,606		23.5%
2010	10,494		21.9%
2020	12,193		16.2%
2024 (est.)	13,803		13.2%
U.S. Decennial Census; 2020 Census

As of the 2023 American Community Survey, there are 5,774 estimated households in Spearfish with an average of 2.04 persons per household. The city has a median household income of $59,731. Approximately 15.2% of the city's population lives at or below the poverty line. Spearfish has an estimated 64.7% employment rate, with 43.6% of the population holding a bachelor's degree or higher and 95.9% holding a high school diploma.

The top five reported ancestries (people were allowed to report up to two ancestries, thus the figures will generally add to more than 100%) were English (96.0%), Spanish (1.7%), Indo-European (0.9%), Asian and Pacific Islander (1.0%), and Other (0.3%).

The median age in the city was 37.2 years.

=== Racial and ethnic composition ===
Spearfish, South Dakota – racial and ethnic composition Note: the US Census treats Hispanic/Latino as an ethnic category. This table excludes Latinos from the racial categories and assigns them to a separate category. Hispanics/Latinos may be of any race.
Race / ethnicity (NH = non-Hispanic)	Pop. 2000	Pop. 2010	Pop. 2020	% 2000	% 2010	% 2020
White alone (NH)	8,121	9,640	10,764	94.36%	91.86%	88.28%
Black or African American alone (NH)	24	41	81	0.28%	0.39%	0.66%
Native American or Alaska Native alone (NH)	189	199	251	2.20%	1.90%	2.06%
Asian alone (NH)	30	116	138	0.35%	1.11%	1.13%
Pacific Islander alone (NH)	2	2	7	0.02%	0.02%	0.06%
Other race alone (NH)	1	6	21	0.01%	0.06%	0.17%
Mixed race or multiracial (NH)	90	203	472	1.05%	1.93%	3.87%
Hispanic or Latino (any race)	149	287	459	1.73%	2.73%	3.76%
Total	8,606	10,494	12,193	100.00%	100.00%	100.00%

=== 2020 census ===
As of the 2020 census, there were 12,193 people, 5,351 households, and 2,780 families residing in the city. The population density was 727.9 inhabitants per square mile (281.0/km^{2}). There were 5,934 housing units at an average density of 354.27 per square mile (136.8/km^{2}).

The median age was 36.7 years. 19.7% of residents were under the age of 18 and 22.2% of residents were 65 years of age or older. For every 100 females there were 90.1 males, and for every 100 females age 18 and over there were 86.6 males age 18 and over.

The 5,351 households included 23.8% with children under the age of 18 living in them, 39.7% were married-couple households, 21.6% were households with a male householder and no spouse or partner present, and 31.7% were households with a female householder and no spouse or partner present. About 39.0% of all households were made up of individuals and 18.6% had someone living alone who was 65 years of age or older. There were 5,934 housing units, of which 9.8% were vacant. The homeowner vacancy rate was 1.3% and the rental vacancy rate was 8.0%.

92.7% of residents lived in urban areas, while 7.3% lived in rural areas.

Racial composition as of the 2020 census
Race	Number	Percent
White	10,961	89.9%
Black or African American	87	0.7%
American Indian and Alaska Native	278	2.3%
Asian	138	1.1%
Native Hawaiian and Other Pacific Islander	8	0.1%
Some other race	98	0.8%
Two or more races	623	5.1%
Hispanic or Latino (of any race)	459	3.8%

=== 2010 census ===
As of the 2010 census, there were 10,494 people, 4,644 households, and 2,350 families residing in the city. The population density was 642.4 inhabitants per square mile (248.0/km^{2}). There were 5,045 housing units at an average density of 308.75 per square mile (119.2/km^{2}). The racial makeup of the city was 93.53% White, 0.41% African American, 2.05% Native American, 1.11% Asian, 0.02% Pacific Islander, 0.59% from some other races and 2.30% from two or more races. Hispanic or Latino people of any race were 2.73% of the population.

There were 4,644 households, of which 23.1% had children under the age of 18 living with them, 38.5% were married couples living together, 8.9% had a female householder with no husband present, 3.3% had a male householder with no wife present, and 49.4% were non-families. 39.3% of all households were made up of individuals, and 16.9% had someone living alone who was 65 years of age or older. The average household size was 2.09 and the average family size was 2.79.

The median age in the city was 33.2 years. 18.6% of residents were under the age of 18; 20.2% were between the ages of 18 and 24; 22.3% were from 25 to 44; 21.2% were from 45 to 64; and 17.7% were 65 years of age or older. The gender makeup of the city was 47.1% male and 52.9% female.

=== 2000 census ===
As of the 2000 census, there were 8,606 people, 3,638 households, and 1,931 families residing in the city. The population density was 1,409.1 inhabitants per square mile (544.1/km^{2}). There were 3,904 housing units at an average density of 639.2 per square mile (246.8/km^{2}). The racial makeup of the city was 95.33% White, 0.35% African American, 2.31% Native American, 0.36% Asian, 0.02% Pacific Islander, 0.33% from some other races and 1.30% from two or more races. Hispanic or Latino people of any race were 1.73% of the population.

In terms of ancestry, 37.5% were of German, 13.5% Norwegian, 9.6% English and 8.2% Irish.

There were 3,638 households, out of which 25.2% had children under the age of 18 living with them, 41.4% were married couples living together, 9.2% had a female householder with no husband present, and 46.9% were non-families. 37.0% of all households were made up of individuals, and 15.5% had someone living alone who was 65 years of age or older. The average household size was 2.15 and the average family size was 2.85.

In the city, the population was spread out, with 20.3% under the age of 18, 21.5% from 18 to 24, 23.3% from 25 to 44, 17.9% from 45 to 64, and 17.1% who were 65 years of age or older. The median age was 32 years. For every 100 females, there were 87.1 males. For every 100 females age 18 and over, there were 83.3 males.

As of 2000 the median income for a household in the city was $26,887, and the median income for a family was $40,257. Males had a median income of $30,242 versus $20,431 for females. The per capita income for the city was $16,565. About 9.8% of families and 17.4% of the population were below the poverty line, including 16.1% of those under age 18 and 9.4% of those age 65 or over.

== Radio and TV stations ==
AM radio

- KBHB 810
- KKLS 920
- KDSJ 980
- KTOQ 1340
- KBFS 1450

FM radio

- KBHU 89.1
- KJKT 90.7
- KRCS 93.1
- KKMK 93.9
- KSQY 95.1
- KZZI 95.9
- KOUT 98.7
- KFXS 100.3
- KDDX 101.1
- KFMH 101.9
- KYDT 103.1
- KIQK 104.1

Television

- KHME Ch. 3 ABC
- KCLO Ch. 16 CBS
- KNBN Ch. 21 NBC
- KBHE-TV Ch. 26 PBS

== Education ==
Spearfish is the home of Black Hills State University, a four-year public university in the South Dakota system. Founded as Spearfish Normal School in 1883, it is still largely a teacher training institution, although its mission has expanded far beyond to include masters programs in Integrative Genomics and Business Administration. It also hosts a summer arts institute, with Spearfish native and international opera star Johanna Meier (daughter of the Black Hills Passion Play founder Joseph Meier) serving as Artistic Director.

It is in the Spearfish School District 40-2.

== Transportation ==
Spearfish is the headquarters and hometown of two bus and coach transport services, Dakota Trailways and Prairie Hills Transit.

Intercity bus service to the city is provided by Jefferson Lines. Local dial-a-ride transit is operated by Prairie Hills Transit. As of July 2024, hours of operation for the service are 7am-7pm on weekdays, 9am-4pm on Saturdays, and 8am-12pm on Sundays.

Black Hills Bike Share is a bikeshare service with two stations located at Spearfish City Park and Black Hills State University.

== Notable people ==
- Blacklite District, musical artist and YouTube star
- Wendell E. Dunn (1894–1965), born near Summit, South Dakota, educator, former resident
- David Eddings, fantasy author who taught at Black Hills State
- Johanna Meier, born in Chicago, Illinois, international opera singer
- Gary Mule Deer, comedian and country musician
- Chester Allan Poage (1980–2000), American murderer victim, originally from Norton, Kansas; lived in this city with his mother and sister before his murder.
- William T. Powers (1820–1909), born in Bristol, New Hampshire, manufacturer, former resident of Spearfish
- Bill Russell, Tony-nominated playwright and lyricist, internationally produced author of musicals for the stage
- Rich Sattgast, state treasurer
- Frank Schoonmaker (1905–1976), born in Spearfish, travel guide writer and wine merchant
- Ernie Smith (1909–1985), college and NFL football player and coach
- Dick Termes, artist
- Jeff Trandahl, 32nd Clerk of the U.S. House of Representatives
- Amy Williams, head coach of Nebraska Cornhuskers women's basketball
