= Myra Jones =

American politician

Member of the Arkansas House of Representatives from the 54th district
- In office January 14, 1985 – January 11, 1999
- Succeeded by: Steve Napper

Personal details
- Born: March 8, 1936 Belle Fourche, South Dakota
- Died: February 20, 2012 (aged 75) Little Rock, Arkansas
- Party: Democratic

Myra Jones (March 8, 1936 – February 20, 2012) was an American politician who served in the Arkansas House of Representatives from the 54th district from 1985 to 1999.

She died of a stroke on February 20, 2012, in Little Rock, Arkansas at age 75.
