= Racing Toward Diversity =

- Founder and CEO: Fields Jackson, Jr.
- Categories: News magazine
- Frequency: Quarterly
- First issue: June 2, 2009; 17 years ago
- Company: Schurz Communications
- Country: United States
- Based in: Cary, North Carolina
- Language: English
- Website: racingtowarddiversity.com

Racing Toward Diversity is an American quarterly news magazine published in Cary, North Carolina. It reports on diversity efforts in businesses. It was founded in 2009 by the South Bend Tribune, owned by Indiana publishing company Schurz Communications, and is the publication's first national magazine.

== History ==
Racing Toward Diversity was founded in 2009 by Director Michael Pozzi, and Fields Jackson, Jr. Jackson was the owner of an African American NASCAR team at the time. The publication was initially intended to focus on NASCAR's diversity efforts, but over time the focus expanded to include diversity efforts among all businesses. Jackson, interviewed in his alma mater Allegheny College's Allegheny Magazine stated his motivation for founding the magazine: "There was a business imperative to do this magazine. The U.S. is competing in a global marketplace. If U.S. business doesn't use the full talent available, we won't compete successfully."

The first issue came out in Spring 2009 and was 36 pages long.

== Circulation ==
As of 2011, the publication was printing about 20,000 copies every quarter. It was distributed mostly for free to Fortune 500 companies, members of the New York Stock Exchange and to select other venues. An annual subscription for four quarterly issues was also available.

By 2014, the magazine was reportedly reaching 3.5 million readers.

== Top 25 list for Diversity and Inclusion ==
The magazine publishes a quarterly Top 25 list for Diversity and Inclusion. The award recognizes 25 businesses with strong diversity efforts related to engaging with minority customers.
