= The Herald-Mail =

Maryland newspaper

- Type: Daily newspaper
- Format: Broadsheet
- Owner: USA Today Co.
- Editor: Jake Womer
- Founded: 1828 (Daily Mail); 1873 (Morning Herald)
- Language: American English
- Headquarters: 100 Summit Avenue; P.O. Box 439; Hagerstown, Maryland 21741
- Circulation: 17,000 daily and Sunday 19,000
- Website: heraldmailmedia.com

The Herald-Mail is a newspaper serving the cities of Hagerstown, Maryland, Chambersburg, Pennsylvania, and Martinsburg, West Virginia and the surrounding counties.

== History ==
The Morning Herald was the first daily newspaper in Hagerstown, beginning publication in 1873. The Mail began in 1828, but was not a daily paper, The Daily Mail, until 1890. In 1920, the two papers merged. In 1960, they were purchased by Schurz Communications of South Bend, Indiana. The Herald-Mail offered them as two weekday newspapers: in the morning, The Morning Herald and in the afternoon, The Daily Mail. On October 1, 2007, the newspaper company combined the two weekday papers into one morning paper, The Herald-Mail. This move followed a national trend of print paper consolidation to better compete with the growing popularity of news resources of the World Wide Web. The Weekend Edition has been and continues to be offered on Saturday and Sunday as a single morning edition also called The Herald-Mail.

== Readership ==
The newspaper has a paid circulation of 17,000 Monday through Saturday and 19,000 on Sunday, as of October 2020. The Herald-Mail has 60,000 average daily readers, 20% of the readership is from readers in Pennsylvania and West Virginia. The Herald-Mail website registers 3 million page-views monthly, with an average of 330,000 unique visitors per month.

In 2025, the paper employed two journalists, down from 12 in 2021.

== Corporate ==
The Herald-Mail has been owned by Schurz Communications since 1960 and functions as the second largest newspaper by circulation in the company. Schurz Communications also owns the area's cable company, Antietam Cable. The headquarters for the newspaper is on 100 Summit Avenue in downtown Hagerstown. Since 2011 It has been printed by The Frederick News-Post in Frederick, MD. In 2019, Schurz sold the paper to GateHouse Media. On August 5, 2019, New Media Investment Group, parent of GateHouse Media, announced that it would acquire Gannett.

== See also ==
- Harry Warner, Jr.
