= Johanna Meier =

American operatic soprano

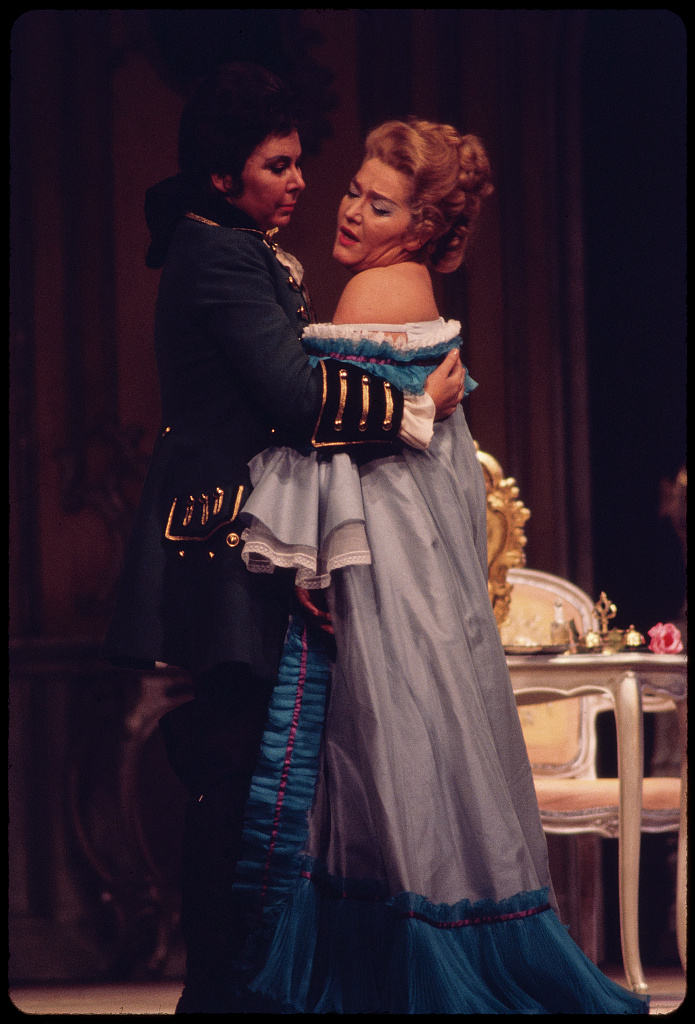
Johanna Meier in Der Rosenkavalier

Johanna Meier (born February 13, 1938) is an American operatic soprano. She has been described as "one of the foremost Wagnerian sopranos of her era". She had an international career, including fourteen years at the Metropolitan Opera and three summers singing the role of Isolde in Wagner's Tristan und Isolde for the Bayreuth Festival—the Festival's first American Isolde.

== Life and career ==
Born in Chicago, Meier was raised in Spearfish, South Dakota and continues to contribute to the State, having founded the School of Opera and Vocal Arts as part of the Black Hills State University Summer Institute of the Arts, for which she also serves as Artistic Director. As her family was touring with the Luenen Passion Play when she was born, she had her stage debut at five weeks and grew up playing various parts; she continued the family's tradition through 2008, staging the play with her husband each summer in Spearfish, with Meier playing the role of Mary.

Meier trained at the University of Miami's Frost School of Music and received the school's first Distinguished Alumnus Award. She also studied under John Brownlee at the Manhattan School of Music before beginning her professional career in 1969 at the New York City Opera, where she sang Mozart roles, slowly adding in roles from Richard Strauss's operas before finally taking on the Wagnerian roles for which she is best known. The City Opera recognized that she was talented both as a singer and as an actress and cast her in several leads.

Meier's debut at the Metropolitan Opera came earlier than planned: she had been scheduled to debut in December 1976, playing Marguerite in Faust, but was sent onstage in April as a last-minute replacement for Montserrat Caballé as Ariadne in Ariadne auf Naxos. During her fourteen years at the Met, she played fifteen roles, including Chrysothemis, Senta, Leonore, the Empress, the Marschallin, Elisabeth, Ellen Orford, Donna Anna, Tosca, Sieglinde, Brünnhilde and Isolde. Especially her interpretation of Wagner's Liebestod is a miracle of subtlety. Meier was seen in the title role of Vanessa (with Christopher Keene conducting), when it was televised from the Spoleto Festival USA, in 1978. She began her stint at Bayreuth in 1981 in the widely praised production of Tristan und Isolde by Jean-Pierre Ponnelle (q.v.); this production was eventually recorded on video. Her final professional performance, in 1994, was as Elektra.

In 2003, she received an honorary doctorate from Black Hills State University. She was married to Guido Della Vecchia, an American‐born tenor, from 1960 until his death in 2013. In January 2014, Meier was awarded the National Opera Association's Lifetime Achievement Award.

In 2008, Miss Meier's book, The Black Hills Passion Play, was published by Arcadia Publishing.

== Commercial discography ==
- Wagner and Liszt songs 1982 Bellaphon 680-01-019
- Weisgall: The Stronger (Weisgall, p. 1972) CRI

== Commercial videography ==
- Wagner: Tristan und Isolde (Kollo; Barenboim, Ponnelle, 1983) [live] Deutsche Grammophon
