= Imperial Valley Press =

Newspaper in El Centro, California

- Type: Daily newspaper
- Owner: Imperial Valley Media
- Founder: Henry C. Reed
- Editor: Thomas Bodus
- Founded: 1901
- Language: English
- Headquarters: 205 N 8th Street; El Centro, CA; United States
- ISSN: 1072-9283
- Website: ivpressonline.com

The Imperial Valley Press (originally known as the Imperial Press) is a daily newspaper published in El Centro, California. It is owned by Imperial Valley Media; shareholders include Rhode Island Suburban Newspapers.

The Imperial Valley Press features local news from all communities of the Imperial Valley and the Mexicali, Baja California area, as well as San Diego County and portions of southwestern Arizona. The newspaper focuses on local news, sports and opinion pieces.

== History ==
On April 20, 1901, Henry C. Reed published the first edition of the weekly Imperial Press in Imperial, California. On November 2, 1901, the paper merged with the Imperial Farmer to become the Imperial Press and Farmer. At that time Edgar F. Howe was named editor and manager. On August 23, 1902, the paper became the property of the Imperial Land Co., who appointed L.M. Holt editor. On March 7, 1903, Howe returned, this time as owner. On May 7,1904. Howe sold the paper to Charles A. Gardner, former publisher of the Pasadena Star.

On November 26, 1904, a group a of five businessmen acquired the paper, including James G. Ellis, who became editor. On April 1, 1905, Felix G. Havens, another owner, succeeded Ellis as editor. On March 3, 1906, Havens moved the paper to El Centro and renamed it to the Imperial Valley Press. At that time the paper's circulation was 1,260. On October 15, 1908, the company launched a daily edition called The El Centro Morning Star. Business manager C. Fred Hayden and editor Allen Kelly managed both papers. The Star ceased after four weeks due to a lack of patronage.

On September 30, 1911, Howe reacquired the Valley Press and the El Centro Daily Standard. He then merged the two publications together to form a single daily paper under the Valley Press masthead. In 1917, Edgar Johnson, owner of the Fullerton Tribune, acquired the Valley Press, and a few months later sold it to Robert W. Weeks. The paper was soon acquired by Merrill D. Davis. In 1922, brothers Ross L. Hammond and Harry W. Hammond bought the Valley Press from Davis and the El Centro Progress from O.B. Tout. Following the sale, the Progress was absorbed into the Valley Press. In 1930, R.L. Hammond died.

In 1935, Paul A. Jenkins, George Bennett and Russell Bennett, bought the Valley Press from H.W. Hammond. The Bennet brothers had founded the El Centro Daily Post a few years earlier. Jenkins acquired the Brawly News in 1944, Indio Date Palm in 1948, and Indio News in 1951. Jenkins sold his El Centro chain to Virgil Pinkley in 1958, who in turn sold them to Schurz Communications in 1964. Over the years the papers were consolidated and the Valley Press was acquired by Imperial Valley News Media Inc. in 2015. The company is a subsidiary under the Alta Newspaper Group. In 2023, the paper switched from carrier to postal delivery and its weekend edition was moved from Saturday to Sunday.
