= KJKT =

- Spearfish, South Dakota; United States
- Frequency: 90.7 MHz
- Branding: The Buzz

Programming
- Format: Alternative

Ownership
- Owner: Black Hills State University

History
- First air date: 1990
- Former call signs: KSPF (2006–2007); KOAR (2007–2009)

Technical information
- Licensing authority: FCC
- Facility ID: 92516
- Class: C3
- ERP: 700 watts
- HAAT: 501.0 meters (1,643.7 ft)
- Transmitter coordinates: 44°19′42″N 103°50′3″W

Links
- Public license information: Public file; LMS
- Webcast: Listen live
- Website: thebuzzfm.net

KJKT (90.7 FM, "The Buzz") is a radio station broadcasting an alternative music format. Licensed to Spearfish, South Dakota, United States, the station is currently owned by Black Hills State University.
