= Newton Fork =

Stream in South Dakota, U.S.

Coordinates: 43°56′04″N 103°34′05″W

Newton Fork is a stream in the U.S. state of South Dakota.

Some say Newton Fork has the name of a state geologist who explored the area, while others believe a prospector gave the creek his name.

== See also ==
- List of rivers of South Dakota
