= Black Hills Symphony Orchestra =

The Black Hills Symphony Orchestra (BHSO) is an American orchestra located in Rapid City, South Dakota serving the Black Hills region, and is a member of the League of American Orchestras. The BHSO is administered by Black Hills Symphony Orchestra Society Inc., a non-profit organization, and utilizes approximately ninety musicians for typically five performances each season. The principal venue for the BHSO is the Performing Arts Center.

The BHSO has partnered with many other local performing organizations, including Dakota Choral Union, Black Hills Dance Theater, Black Hills Community Theater, and Bells Of The Hills. The BHSO is currently conducted by Bruce Knowles; the concertmaster is Amanda Swartz.

== History ==
The orchestra was founded in 1930s by a small group of string players as the Rapid City Symphony Orchestra.

Alex Schneider, a local high school band and orchestra director, served as conductor from 1937 until 1942. Vernon Malone conducted in the 1940s. Violinist and businessman Arnold Rudd took over as conductor in 1952 and served until 1972 when Jack Knowles was named conductor. In 2009, after a regional search, Jack's son Bruce Knowles (who had assisted conducting since 2000) was named conductor and is now the music director after the death of his father.

In 1977, the Rapid City Symphony Orchestra Society was formed to oversee the orchestra. In 1988 the group took up its current name of "Black Hills Symphony Orchestra," recognizing the fact that its members and audience are drawn from the larger Black Hills area. The symphony is one of two major orchestras in South Dakota.

== Education ==
The Black Hills Symphony Orchestra provides educational opportunities to the youth of the Black Hills area through the following programs: Symphony Safari, Music In the Schools, Young Artist Competition (with the Black Hills Symphony League). Many members of the orchestra are involved in local public and private school music instruction and teach privately.
