= KYDT =

- Pine Haven, Wyoming; United States
- Broadcast area: Sundance, Wyoming; Belle Fourche, South Dakota
- Frequency: 103.1 MHz

Programming
- Format: Talk radio
- Affiliations: ESPN Radio; Westwood One; Denver Nuggets; Motor Racing Network

Ownership
- Owner: Andrea Wood, Matthew Wood, Ogden Driskill, and Tyler Lindholm; (Tri State Communications, LLC)
- Sister stations: KBFS

History
- First air date: 1997

Technical information
- Licensing authority: FCC
- Facility ID: 78241
- Class: C1
- ERP: 25,000 watts
- HAAT: 503 meters (1,650 ft)
- Transmitter coordinates: 44°28′35″N 104°26′54″W

Links
- Public license information: Public file; LMS
- Webcast: Listen live
- Website: kydt.com

KYDT (103.1 FM) is a radio station broadcasting a talk radio format. Licensed to Pine Haven, Wyoming, United States, it serves the Sundance, Wyoming and Belle Fourche, South Dakota, region of the Black Hills. It is owned by Andrea Wood, Matthew Wood, Ogden Driskill, and Tyler Lindholm, through licensee Tri State Communications, LLC, and features programming from ESPN Radio and Westwood One.

The station broadcasts in mono instead of traditional FM stereo.

== History ==
KYDT first signed on the air in 1997. It was established as a high-power FM sister station to KBFS (1450 AM), designed to provide coverage to the rugged tri-state region of South Dakota, Montana, and Wyoming.

=== Ownership Transitions ===
The station spent its early decades under the leadership of Karl Grimmelmann through his company Ultimate Caps, Inc. In February 2021, a sale was announced to Tri State Communications, LLC, a group consisting of Wyoming-based principals Andrea Wood, Matthew Wood, and state legislators Ogden Driskill and Tyler Lindholm. The acquisition was finalized in March 2022, officially moving the station’s operational headquarters to studios in Moorcroft, Wyoming.
