= The HomeSlice Group =

- Industry: Media
- Founded: 1994
- Headquarters: Sturgis, South Dakota United States
- Key people: Dean Kinney, Clint Brengle, Mark Bruch, Mike Bruch
- Products: Broadcast Radio, Digital Media, Print Media, Artist Management, Event Promotion
- Website: thehomeslicegroup.com

The HomeSlice Group is an American media and entertainment conglomerate based in the Black Hills of South Dakota. The HomeSlice Group is the worldwide exclusive licensing agent of the Sturgis Motorcycle Rally and artist management company for Chancey Williams. The firm owns six radio stations in the Rapid City, South Dakota DMA and entered into a binding asset purchase agreement on October 30, 2015 to acquire all of the radio station assets of Rushmore Media Company, a subsidiary of Schurz Communications. The company is also the owner and operator of the Rapid City Post. HomeSlice was formed in 1994 and incorporated in 1995. The company is rooted in the live entertainment business and now produces around 500 concerts a year. HomeSlice also operates an advertising agency and has been involved in financial services marketing for nearly 20 years.

Their latest project is with the 76th Sturgis Motorcycle Rally and Snapchat, with which they have organized Snapchat Live coverage of the event.

== Radio Station Ownership ==
On July 1, 2014 HomeSlice acquired two Rapid City / Sturgis, South Dakota radio stations: KBHB “The Big 81” and sister-station KKLS “News Talk” KBHB is the most powerful radio station in South Dakota. In November 2015, HomeSlice Media announced an agreement with Gray Television to acquire 98.7 KAT Country, 100.3 The Fox, 93.9 The Mix, and Hot 93.1 from Rushmore Media Company, a subsidiary of Schurz Communications, Inc.

== Loud American Sturgis ==
The Loud American Sturgis is a bar, restaurant, and live entertainment venue in Sturgis, South Dakota. HomeSlice purchased the entertainment complex in 2001.
