= Schurz Communications =

Internet services company based in South Bend, Indiana

Schurz Communications, Inc.
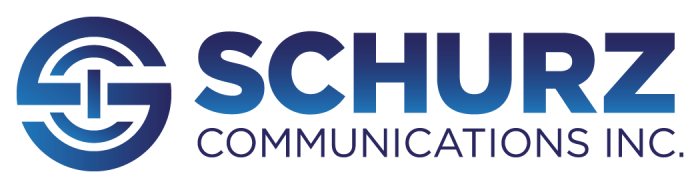
- Type: Private
- Industry: Broadband, cloud services provider
- Founded: 1872
- Founder: Alfred B. Miller and Elmer Crockett
- Successor: Gray Media (television assets only); Gannett (newspaper assets only)
- Headquarters: Mishawaka, Indiana
- Key people: John Reardon (President and CEO)
- Website: www.schurz.com

Schurz Communications, Inc. is an American broadband media group and cloud services provider based in South Bend, Indiana. It previously owned newspapers and television stations.

== History ==
The company was founded in 1872 by Alfred B. Miller and Elmer Crockett with the creation of the South Bend Tribune. Over the years, the company grew through the acquisition of other newspapers, media outlets, radio and television stations, digital companies, broadband operations and cloud services provider. The expanding company was renamed Schurz Communications Inc. in 1976, when the newspapers division and the TV/broadcast division were split into separate entities.

Schurz Communications announced on September 14, 2015, that it would exit broadcasting and sell its television and radio stations, including the Rushmore Media Company stations, to Gray Television for $442.5 million. Gray subsequently announced on October 1 that it would sell the KOTA-TV license to Legacy Broadcasting for $1, a deal that also includes the license for satellite station KHSD-TV and the station's subchannel affiliations with MeTV and This TV; a month later, on November 2, Gray announced that HomeSlice Media Group would acquire the Rushmore Media Company radio stations for $2.2 million, reuniting them with KBHB and KKLS, which Schurz had sold to HomeSlice in 2014 as part of its acquisition of KOTA-TV. Following the completion of these sales, Gray will retain KOTA-TV's ABC affiliation and transfer it to its existing television station in Rapid City, KEVN-TV; it will also retain KOTA-TV satellite stations KDUH-TV and KSGW-TV and convert them to satellites of KNOP-TV in North Platte, Nebraska and KCWY-DT in Casper, Wyoming (both NBC affiliates), respectively.

In March 2015, the company sold the Imperial Valley Press newspaper based in El Centro, California.

In September 2016, The American News and Farm Forum, owned by Schurz, acquired The Public Opinion newspaper in Watertown, South Dakota from United Communications.

In February 2018, the company acquired the Ann Arbor, Michigan-based Online Tech. The compliant hybrid cloud provider serves nearly 500 clients across the Midwest with its network of seven data centers and full suite of hybrid cloud services. In December of that year, Online Tech acquired the assets and products of IT provider Neverfail. The acquisition includes Neverfail's five cloud nodes and assets in North America, Europe and Asia-Pacific.

In January 2019, Schurz sold its publishing division and all its newspapers to GateHouse Media for $30 million. This included 20 regional papers and several special publications in Indiana, Maryland, Michigan, Pennsylvania and South Dakota. GateHouse later bought the Gannett newspaper chain, and the expanded network of newspapers adopted the Gannett name.

In March 2019, Schurz Communications bought the city-owned local broadband company Burlington Telecom of Burlington, Vermont for a total of $30.8 million.

=== Rushmore Media Company ===
Rushmore Media Company, Inc. was a small radio broadcasting subsidiary, which owned and operated four radio stations and one television station in the Black Hills region of western South Dakota. The main offices and stations' studios are located at 660 Flormann St., Rapid City, South Dakota 57701.

Rushmore Media Company's group consisted of:

- KRCS FM 93.1 "Today's Hottest Music"
- KKMK FM 93.9 "93.9 The Mix, The Black Hills Best Mix."
- KOUT FM 98.7 "The Black Hills' Favorite Country"
- KFXS FM 100.3 "Classic Rock 100.3 The Fox"
- KHME channel 3 (ABC) (formerly KOTA-TV, "KOTA Territory")
  - KDUH-TV channel 4 Scottsbluff, Nebraska (satellite of KHME)
  - KQME channel 11 Lead, South Dakota (satellite of KHME)
  - KSGW-TV channel 12 Sheridan, Wyoming (satellite of KHME)

== Current properties ==
Schurz Communications' old logo

=== Broadband systems ===
- Antietam Broadband - Hagerstown, Maryland
- Burlington Telecom - Burlington, Vermont
- Hiawatha Broadband - Winona, Minnesota
- Long Lines Broadband - Sergeant Bluff, Iowa
- Orbitel Communications - Maricopa, Arizona

=== Cloud Managed Services ===
- Otava - Ann Arbor, Michigan [1]

== Former properties ==
=== Newspapers ===
- Imperial Valley Press - El Centro, California
- Times Mail - Bedford, Indiana
- Southside Times - Beech Grove, Indiana
- The Herald-Times - Bloomington, Indiana
- The Hoosier Topics - Cloverdale, Indiana
- Fishers Weekly - Fishers, Indiana
- Reporter-Times - Martinsville, Indiana
- Mooresville-Decatur Times - Mooresville, Indiana
- Noblesville Daily Times - Noblesville, Indiana
- South Bend Tribune - South Bend, Indiana
- Evening World - Spencer, Indiana
- The Advocate-Messenger - Danville, Kentucky
- The Jessamine Journal - Nicholasville, Kentucky
- The Interior Journal - Stanford, Kentucky
- The Winchester Sun - Winchester, Kentucky
- The Herald-Mail - Hagerstown, Maryland
- Charlevoix Courier - Charlevoix, Michigan
- Gaylord Herald Times - Gaylord, Michigan
- Petoskey News-Review - Petoskey, Michigan
- Daily American - Somerset, Pennsylvania
- The American News - Aberdeen, South Dakota
- The Public Opinion - Watertown, South Dakota

=== Stations ===
- Stations are arranged in alphabetical order by state and city of license.
- Two boldface asterisks appearing following a station's call letters (**) indicate a station built and signed on by Schurz.

Stations owned by Schurz Communications
Media market	State	Station	Purchased	Sold	Notes
Anchorage	Alaska	KTUU-TV	2008	2016	
Augusta	Georgia	WAGT	1980	2016	(Note: Owned by a third party and operated by Schurz.)
Lafayette	Indiana	WASK	1991	2016	
Lafayette	Indiana	WASK-FM	1995	2016	
Lafayette	Indiana	WKHY	2005	2016	
Lafayette	Indiana	WKOA	1991	2016	
Lafayette	Indiana	WXXB	2005	2016	
South Bend	Indiana	WNSN	1962	2016	
South Bend	Indiana	WSBT	1922	2016	
South Bend	Indiana	WSBT-TV **	1952	2016	
South Bend	Indiana	WZOC	2012	2016	(Note: Owned by Douglas Road Radio, Schurz held a minority interest in this company.)
Ensign	Kansas	KBSD-DT	2006	2016	(Note: Satellite of KWCH-DT.)
Goodland	Kansas	KBSL-DT	2006	2016	
Hays	Kansas	KBSH-DT	2006	2016	
Hutchinson–Wichita	Kansas	KDCU-DT	2008	2016	
Hutchinson–Wichita	Kansas	KSCW-DT	2007	2016	
Hutchinson–Wichita	Kansas	KWCH-DT	2006	2016	
Benton Harbor	Michigan	WHFB-FM	2012	2016	
Springfield	Missouri	K15CZ-D	2002	2016	
Springfield	Missouri	KSPR	2007	2017	(Note: Owned by Schurz from 2016 to 2017 and operated by Gray Media.)
Springfield	Missouri	KYTV	1987	2016	
Scottsbluff	Nebraska	KDUH-TV	2014	2016	(Note: Satellite of KOTA-TV.)
Lead	South Dakota	KHSD-TV	2014	2016	
Rapid City	South Dakota	KFXS	2006	2016	
Rapid City	South Dakota	KKLS	2006	2014	
Rapid City	South Dakota	KKMK	2006	2016	
Rapid City	South Dakota	KOTA-TV	2014	2016	
Rapid City	South Dakota	KOUT	2006	2016	
Sturgis	South Dakota	KBHB	2006	2014	
Sturgis	South Dakota	KRCS	2006	2016	
Sheridan	Wyoming	KSGW-TV	2014	2016	
Roanoke–Lynchburg	Virginia	WDBJ	1969	2016	

== See also ==
- Schurz Communications, Incorporated v. Federal Communications Commission and United States of America
