= KBFS =

Radio station in Belle Fourche, South Dakota

- Belle Fourche, South Dakota; United States
- Broadcast area: Rapid City area
- Frequency: 1450 kHz

Programming
- Format: Talk radio
- Affiliations: Motor Racing Network

Ownership
- Owner: Andrea Wood, Matthew Wood, Ogden Driskill and Tyler Lindholm; (Tri State Communications, LLC)
- Sister stations: KYDT

History
- First air date: 1959

Technical information
- Licensing authority: FCC
- Facility ID: 68739
- Class: C
- Power: 1,000 watts
- Transmitter coordinates: 44°40′2″N 103°51′22″W

Links
- Public license information: Public file; LMS
- Website: kbfs.com

KBFS (1450 AM) is a radio station broadcasting a talk radio format. Licensed to Belle Fourche, South Dakota, United States, the station serves the Rapid City area. The station is currently owned by Andrea Wood, Matthew Wood, Ogden Driskill, and Tyler Lindholm, through licensee Tri State Communications, LLC.

== History ==
KBFS is one of the longest-running broadcast facilities in the tri-state region of South Dakota, Montana, and Wyoming, having first gone on the air in 1959. In March 1994, the station was purchased for approximately $95,000 by Ultimate Caps, Inc., a company owned by Karl Grimmelmann. Under Grimmelmann's leadership, KBFS expanded its service through the launch of sister station KYDT (103.1 FM) in November 1997. For nearly three decades, Grimmelmann served as general manager, maintaining the station's focus on local sporting events and high-school coverage. In December 2020, Grimmelmann announced his retirement and reached an agreement to sell the station cluster to Tri State Communications, LLC. The sale was finalized in 2022, transferring ownership to a group led by Moorcroft-based principals Andrea and Matthew Wood, along with state politicians Ogden Driskill and Tyler Lindholm. The station’s branding was subsequently refreshed as "Dirt Road Radio" during the day and "Patriot Radio" at night to appeal to a broad tri-state audience. Tri State acquired the station along with sister station KYDT (103.1 FM) in early 2022. Under this management, the stations operate from studios in Moorcroft, Wyoming, but maintain a community presence in Belle Fourche with physical local contacts.

== Programming ==
The station carries Denver Broncos, Colorado Rockies, and University of Wyoming athletics, alongside local NASCAR coverage.
