= KFXS =

- Rapid City, South Dakota; United States
- Broadcast area: Rapid City, South Dakota
- Frequency: 100.3 MHz
- Branding: Real Rock 100.3 The Fox

Programming
- Format: Classic rock
- Affiliations: United Stations Radio Networks

Ownership
- Owner: HomeSlice Media Group, LLC
- Sister stations: KBHB, KKLS, KKMK, KOUT, KRCS

History
- First air date: 1977 (as KGGG-FM); October 28, 1994 (as KFXS)
- Former call signs: KGGG-FM (1977–1994)

Technical information
- Licensing authority: FCC
- Facility ID: 66821
- Class: C1
- ERP: 100,000 watts
- HAAT: 141 meters (463 feet)
- Transmitter coordinates: 44°4′13″N 103°15′1″W
- Translator: 96.9 K245BD (Spearfish)

Links
- Public license information: Public file; LMS
- Webcast: Listen live
- Website: foxradio.com

KFXS (100.3 FM, "Real Rock 100.3 The Fox") is a radio station licensed to serve Rapid City, South Dakota. The station is owned by HomeSlice Media Group, LLC. It airs a rock music format heavy on 80s and 90s classic rock. It competes with K-SKY and X-Rock next door at 95.1 and 101.1.

Notable on-air personalities include D. Ray Knight (weekdays 6-10), Jake Michaels (weekdays 10-2) and Gunner (weekdays 2-7) The station was assigned the KFXS call letters by the Federal Communications Commission on October 28, 1994.

== Ownership ==
In May 1999, Triad Broadcasting reached a deal to acquire this station from Brothers Jim and Tom Instad as part of a twelve-station deal valued at a reported $37.8 million.

In July 2006, Schurz Communications Inc. reached an agreement to buy this station from Triad Broadcasting Co. as part of a six-station deal valued at a reported $19 million. Schurz Communications created the Black Hills broadcast division, New Rushmore Radio, now known as Rushmore Media Company, Inc.

Schurz Communications announced on September 14, 2015 that it would exit broadcasting and sell its television and radio stations, including KFXS, to Gray Television for $442.5 million. Though Gray initially intended to keep Schurz' radio stations, on November 2, it announced that HomeSlice Media Group, LLC would acquire KFXS and the other Rushmore Media Company radio stations for $2.2 million; the deal reunited the stations with KBHB and KKLS, which HomeSlice acquired from Schurz in 2014 following its purchase of KOTA-TV. The HomeSlice purchase was consummated on February 15, 2016 at a price of $2.5 million.
