= KRCS =

Coordinates: 44.333°N 103.539°W

- Sturgis, South Dakota; United States
- Broadcast area: Rapid City, South Dakota
- Frequency: 93.1 MHz
- Branding: Hot 93.1

Programming
- Format: Top 40 (CHR)

Ownership
- Owner: HomeSlice Media Group, LLC
- Sister stations: KBHB, KFXS, KKLS, KKMK, KOUT

History
- First air date: 1990
- Call sign meaning: Rapid City & Sturgis

Technical information
- Licensing authority: FCC
- Facility ID: 9668
- Class: C1
- ERP: 97,800 watts
- HAAT: 323 meters
- Translators: 97.5 K248BT (Rapid City); 98.3 K252DN (Spearfish); 103.9 K280AJ (Hill City)

Links
- Public license information: Public file; LMS
- Webcast: Listen Live
- Website: hot931.com

KRCS (93.1 FM, "Hot 93.1") is a radio station that airs a Top 40 (CHR) format in the Rapid City and the Black Hills area. The station is owned by HomeSlice Media Group, LLC, and is licensed to Sturgis, South Dakota.

== Ownership ==
In May 1999, Triad Broadcasting reached a deal to acquire this station from Brothers Jim and Tom Instad as part of a twelve-station deal valued at a reported $37.8 million.

In July 2006, Schurz Communications. reached an agreement to buy this station from Triad Broadcasting Co. as part of a six-station deal valued at a reported $19 million. Schurz Communications created the Black Hills broadcast division, New Rushmore Radio, now known as Rushmore Media Company.

Schurz Communications announced on September 14, 2015 that it would exit broadcasting and sell its television and radio stations, including KRCS, to Gray Television for $442.5 million. Though Gray initially intended to keep Schurz' radio stations, on November 2, it announced that HomeSlice Media Group, LLC would acquire KRCS and the other Rushmore Media Company radio stations for $2.2 million; the deal reunites the stations with KBHB and KKLS, which HomeSlice acquired from Schurz in 2014 following its purchase of KOTA-TV. The sale to HomeSlice Media was consummated on February 15, 2016 at a price of $2.5 million.
