= KDSJ =

Radio station in Deadwood, South Dakota

- Deadwood, South Dakota; United States
- Broadcast area: Black Hills Area
- Frequency: 980 kHz
- Branding: Live. Local. News. Weather. Sports.

Programming
- Format: Full-service

Ownership
- Owner: Carolyn and Doyle Becker; (Riverfront Broadcasting, LLC)

History
- First air date: August 1947

Technical information
- Licensing authority: FCC
- Facility ID: 24553
- Class: B
- Power: 5,000 watts (day); 1,000 watts (night)
- Transmitter coordinates: 44°22′56.9″N 103°39′45.7″W
- Translator: 103.5 K278AM (Spearfish)

Links
- Public license information: Public file; LMS
- Webcast: Listen live
- Website: kdsj980.com

KDSJ (980 AM) is a radio station broadcasting a full-service format. Licensed to Deadwood, South Dakota, United States, the station serves the Black Hills area. The station is currently owned by Carolyn and Doyle Becker, through licensee Riverfront Broadcasting, LLC.

The station has had several studio locations since its debut in 1947. In 1952, the station moved to its present location, a former funeral home, at 745 Main Street in Deadwood. Its two tower transmitter site is in Boulder Canyon on Radio Tower Road. The station broadcasts with 5,000 watts during the day and 1,000 watts at night.

Effective June 30, 2020, the station was purchased for $80,000 by Riverfront Broadcasting from 4 Paws Broadcasting. Riverfront owns four FM stations in Rapid City and one AM station. As part of this, the station has announced it will be moving to Lead, hopefully completed by Fall of 2021.
