= KOUT =

Radio station in Rapid City, South Dakota

- Rapid City, South Dakota; United States
- Frequency: 98.7 MHz
- Branding: The Black Hills Favorite Country

Programming
- Format: Country

Ownership
- Owner: HomeSlice Media Group, LLC
- Sister stations: KBHB, KFXS, KKLS, KKMK, KRCS

Technical information
- Licensing authority: FCC
- Facility ID: 14642
- Class: C1
- ERP: 100,000 watts
- HAAT: 141 meters (463 feet)
- Transmitter coordinates: 44°04′13″N 103°15′01″W

Links
- Public license information: Public file; LMS
- Website: http://www.katradio.com/

KOUT (98.7 FM, "Kat Country 98.7") is a radio station licensed to serve Rapid City, South Dakota. The station is owned by HomeSlice Media Group, LLC. It airs a country music format.

The station was assigned the KOUT call letters by the Federal Communications Commission on November 29, 1991.

Notable on-air personalities include "The Roadhouse" with Amy, Brandon Jones, Dean Taylor, and the "2nd Shift" with Mark Houston, Dean Taylor, Leslie Lane, and Stitch. Syndicated show The Big Time with Whitney Allen on evenings.

== Ownership ==
In May 1999, Triad Broadcasting reached a deal to acquire this station from brothers Jim and Tom Ingstad as part of a twelve-station deal valued at a reported $37.8 million.

In July 2006, Schurz Communications reached an agreement to buy this station from Triad Broadcasting Co. as part of a six-station deal valued at a reported $19 million. Schurz Communications created the Black Hills broadcast division, New Rushmore Radio, now known as Rushmore Media Company, Inc.

Schurz Communications announced on September 14, 2015 that it would exit broadcasting and sell its television and radio stations, including KOUT, to Gray Television for $442.5 million. Though Gray initially intended to keep Schurz' radio stations, on November 2, it announced that HomeSlice Media Group, LLC would acquire KOUT and the other Rushmore Media Company radio stations for $2.2 million; the deal reunites the stations with KBHB and KKLS, which HomeSlice acquired from Schurz in 2014 following its purchase of KOTA-TV. The sale to HomeSlice Media was consummated on February 15, 2016 at a price of $2.5 million.
