= KKMK =

Radio station in Rapid City, South Dakota

- Rapid City, South Dakota; United States
- Frequency: 93.9 MHz
- Branding: 93.9 The Mix

Programming
- Format: Hot adult contemporary
- Affiliations: Premiere Networks

Ownership
- Owner: HomeSlice Media Group, LLC
- Sister stations: KBHB, KFXS, KKLS, KOUT, KRCS

History
- First air date: 1971 (as KKLS-FM)
- Former call signs: KKLS-FM (1971–1987); KPHR (1987–1989)

Technical information
- Licensing authority: FCC
- Facility ID: 61325
- Class: C1
- ERP: 100,000 watts 53 watts (translator)
- HAAT: 209 meters (686 ft)
- Transmitter coordinates: 44°2′49″N 103°14′45″W
- Translator: 92.5 K223BT (Spearfish)

Links
- Public license information: Public file; LMS
- Webcast: Listen Live
- Website: 939themix.com

KKMK (93.9 FM, "93.9 The Mix") is a radio station in Rapid City, South Dakota, airing a hot adult contemporary format.

== Ownership ==
In May 1999, Triad Broadcasting reached a deal to acquire this station from Brothers Jim and Tom Instad as part of a twelve-station deal valued at a reported $37.8 million.

In July 2006, Schurz Communications Inc. reached an agreement to buy this station from Triad Broadcasting Co. as part of a six-station deal valued at a reported $19 million. Schurz Communications created the Black Hills broadcast division, New Rushmore Radio, now known as Rushmore Media Company.

Schurz Communications announced on September 14, 2015 that it would exit broadcasting and sell its television and radio stations, including KKMK, to Gray Television for $442.5 million. Though Gray initially intended to keep Schurz' radio stations, on November 2, it announced that HomeSlice Media Group, LLC would acquire KKMK and the other Rushmore Media Company radio stations for $2.2 million; the deal reunites the stations with KBHB and KKLS, which HomeSlice acquired from Schurz in 2014 following its purchase of KOTA-TV. The sale to HomeSlice Media was consummated on February 15, 2016 at a price of $2.5 million.
