= KBHB =

Radio station in Sturgis, South Dakota

- Sturgis, South Dakota; United States
- Broadcast area: Rapid City, South Dakota
- Frequency: 810 kHz
- Branding: Big 81

Programming
- Format: Farm information.

Ownership
- Owner: HomeSlice Media Group, LLC
- Sister stations: KFXS, KKLS, KKMK, KOUT, KRCS

History
- First air date: February 1963

Technical information
- Licensing authority: FCC
- Facility ID: 9673
- Class: D
- Power: 25,000 watts day 60 watts night
- Transmitter coordinates: 44°25′24″N 103°25′37″W
- Translator: (105.5 MHz) K288HB (Sturgis)

Links
- Public license information: Public file; LMS
- Webcast: Listen Live
- Website: kbhbradio.com

KBHB (810 AM) is a radio station broadcasting a farm/news related format. Licensed to Sturgis, South Dakota, United States, it serves the Rapid City area. The station is currently owned by HomeSlice Media Group and features programming from ABC Radio.

KBHB signed on in February 1963 on 1280 kHz. It moved to 810 kHz in 1967.

810 AM is a United States clear-channel frequency; WGY in Schenectady, New York and KSFO in San Francisco, California are the Class A stations on this frequency.

== Ownership ==
In May 1999, Triad Broadcasting reached a deal to acquire this station from brothers Jim and Tom Instad as part of a twelve-station deal valued at a reported $37.8 million.

In July 2006, Schurz Communications Inc. reached an agreement to buy this station from Triad Broadcasting Co. as part of a six-station deal valued at a reported $19 million.

Schurz Communications created the Black Hills broadcast division, New Rushmore Radio, now known as Rushmore Media Company. KBHB was sold to HomeSlice Media Group, LLC in July 2014, a divestiture was required due to Schurz's acquisition of KOTA-TV. The transaction, which included sister station KKLS and translator K284BA, was consummated on June 30, 2014, at a price of $650,000.
