= KIQK =

- Rapid City, South Dakota; United States
- Broadcast area: Rapid City area
- Frequency: 104.1 MHz
- Branding: Kick 104

Programming
- Format: Country music

Ownership
- Owner: Haugo Broadcasting, Inc
- Sister stations: KSQY, KTOQ

Technical information
- Licensing authority: FCC
- Facility ID: 67310
- Class: C1
- ERP: 100,000 watts
- HAAT: 164 meters (538 ft)
- Transmitter coordinates: 44°1′19″N 103°15′33″W

Links
- Public license information: Public file; LMS
- Website: kick104.com

KIQK (104.1 FM) is a radio station broadcasting a country music format. Licensed to Rapid City, South Dakota, United States, the station serves the Rapid City area. The station is currently owned by Haugo Broadcasting, Inc.

== History ==
The station went on the air as KTOQ-FM on November 29, 1989. On September 1, 1991, the station changed its call sign to KIQN; further, on October 7, 1991 its call sign changed to the current KIQK.

In 1998, Haugo Broadcasting (owner of KSQY) acquired Rapid City stations KIQK "Kick 104" and KTOQ "K-Talk 1340" from Tom-Tom Broadcasting, then owned by NBC news anchor Tom Brokaw. Soon after the purchase, KSQY moved its studios to Rapid City and joined its new sister stations. In Sept 2008, Haugo Broadcasting moved into its new facilities at 3601 Canyon Lake Drive.
