= KKLS (AM) =

- Rapid City, South Dakota; United States
- Broadcast area: Rapid City, South Dakota
- Frequency: 920 kHz
- Branding: The Cowboy

Programming
- Format: Classic country

Ownership
- Owner: HomeSlice Media Group, LLC
- Sister stations: KBHB, KFXS, KKMK, KOUT, KRCS

History
- First air date: June 7, 1959
- Former call signs: KEZU (1959–1971)

Technical information
- Licensing authority: FCC
- Facility ID: 61320
- Class: D
- Power: 5,000 watts (day); 111 watts (night)
- Transmitter coordinates: 44°3′43″N 103°10′32″W
- Translator: 104.7 K284BA (Rapid City)

Links
- Public license information: Public file; LMS
- Webcast: Listen Live
- Website: thecowboyradio.com

KKLS (920 AM) is a radio station licensed to serve Rapid City, South Dakota. The station is owned by HomeSlice Media Group.

== History ==
The station was first licensed as KEZU in 1959. On July 9, 1971, the call letters were changed to KKLS. It was a Top 40 station during the 1970s.

=== Expanded Band assignment ===
On March 17, 1997, the Federal Communications Commission (FCC) announced that eighty-eight stations had been given permission to move to newly available "Expanded Band" transmitting frequencies, ranging from 1610 to 1700 kHz, with KEZU authorized to move from 920 to 1700 kHz. However, the station never procured the Construction Permit needed to implement the authorization, so the expanded band station was never built.

=== Later history ===
In May 1999, Triad Broadcasting reached a deal to acquire this station from Brothers Jim and Tom Instad as part of a twelve-station deal valued at a reported $37.8 million.

In July 2006, Schurz Communications Inc. reached an agreement to buy this station from Triad Broadcasting Co. as part of a six-station deal valued at a reported $19 million.

On September 10, 2010, KKLS dropped the True Oldies Channel, and began using the moniker "97.5 - The Hills", playing a mix of songs from the 1970s to the 2000s. While the FM frequency was now given the focus, the AM parent carried the same broadcast.

Schurz Communications created the Black Hills broadcast division, New Rushmore Radio, now known as Rushmore Media Company. KKLS was sold to the Homeslice Media Group in July 2014, a divestiture required due to Schurz's acquisition of KOTA-TV. The transaction, which included sister station KBHB and translator K284BA, was consummated on June 30, 2014, at a price of $650,000.

As of January 1, 2015, KKLS changed their format to classic hits, branded as "Smash Hits KKLS", switching translators to K284BA 104.7 FM Rapid City.

As of March 1, 2018, KKLS changed their format to News/Talk, branded as "News. Talk. Radio".

On January 13, 2020, KKLS dropped its news/talk format and began stunting with a loop of "Old Town Road" by Lil Nas X and Billy Ray Cyrus, and cryptic liners consisting of recitations of country music song lyrics, followed by the announcement "He's coming- January 21st.". On January 21, KKLS flipped to classic country, branded as "The Cowboy".
