= KTOQ =

Radio station in Rapid City, South Dakota

- Rapid City, South Dakota; United States
- Broadcast area: Rapid City, South Dakota
- Frequency: 1340 kHz
- Branding: ESPN Rapid City

Programming
- Format: Sports
- Affiliations: ESPN Radio, Westwood One

Ownership
- Owner: Haugo Broadcasting, Inc.
- Sister stations: KSQY and KIQK

History
- First air date: 1953

Technical information
- Licensing authority: FCC
- Facility ID: 67309
- Class: C
- Power: 1,000 watts
- ERP: 250 watts (FM translator)
- Transmitter coordinates: 44°4′6″N 103°10′11″W
- Translator: 105.7 K289AI (Rapid City)

Links
- Public license information: Public file; LMS
- Webcast: Listen Live
- Website: www.espnrapidcity.com

KTOQ (1340 AM) is a radio station broadcasting a sports format. Licensed to Rapid City, South Dakota, United States, the station serves the Rapid City area. The station is currently owned by Haugo Broadcasting, Inc., and features programming from ESPN Radio and Westwood One.

== History ==
The station, operating on 1340 kHz, first signed on the air in 1953. For a period, the station operated under the call letters KRSD (AM) and was owned by The Heart of the Black Hills Stations, which also owned the first television station to use the KRSD-TV call sign in 1958. During the 1960s, the KRSD-TV sister station became embroiled in significant and repeated technical disputes with the Federal Communications Commission (FCC) over severe maintenance issues, including faulty equipment, poorly kept logs, and inadequate tower lighting. This led to the television license being revoked in 1971, although the TV station remained on air until 1976.

The station's call sign was later changed to KTOQ and adopted the branding "K-Talk 1340," which focused on a News/Talk format. In the 1970s through late 1990s, the station was owned by Tom-Tom Broadcasting. Tom-Tom Broadcasting was founded and controlled by famed NBC News anchor and Rapid City native, Tom Brokaw, and his friend and long-time business partner, John Kearns. Kearns was the partner who moved to Rapid City to actively own and run KTOQ, while Brokaw maintained his high-profile network television career. Kearns retired in 1997 when Brokaw purchased his half of the company. In 1998, the station, along with its sister station KIQK "Kick 104," was acquired by its current owner, Haugo Broadcasting, Inc. Haugo Broadcasting subsequently moved the station's studios to 3601 Canyon Lake Drive in Rapid City, where it operates alongside its sister stations KSQY and KIQK.

In April 2012, KTOQ changed its format to sports, with programming from ESPN Radio.

In March 2013, KTOQ began simulcasting its signal on the FM dial via translator K289AI on 105.7 MHz in Rapid City.
