= KSQY =

Radio station in Deadwood–Rapid City, South Dakota

Coordinates: 44.330°N 103.837°W

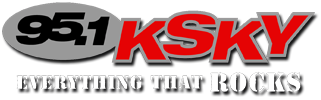
- Deadwood, South Dakota; United States
- Broadcast area: Rapid City area
- Frequency: 95.1 MHz
- Branding: 95.1 K-SKY

Programming
- Format: Mainstream rock
- Affiliations: Compass Media Networks

Ownership
- Owner: Haugo Broadcasting, Inc
- Sister stations: KIQK, KTOQ

History
- First air date: 1982
- Call sign meaning: K-"SKY" in reference to its large signal

Technical information
- Licensing authority: FCC
- Facility ID: 3041
- Class: C
- ERP: 100,000 watts
- HAAT: 521 meters
- Repeater: 95.1 KSQY-FM1 (Rapid City)

Links
- Public license information: Public file; LMS
- Webcast: Listen live
- Website: 951ksky.com

KSQY (95.1 FM) is a radio station broadcasting a mainstream rock format. The station known as "K-SKY" is licensed to Deadwood, South Dakota and serves the Rapid City listening area. K-SKY is owned by Haugo Broadcasting, Inc.

== History ==
95.1 K-SKY began broadcasting in August 1982 from a tower on the summit of Terry Peak in Lead, South Dakota giving the station a very large coverage area that reaches parts of five states. K-SKY uses a 17,000 watt booster licensed to Rapid City to help cover the Rapid City metro with a stronger signal.

During the mid-1980s, K-SKY was one of the highest rated Album-oriented rock stations in the US. Through the years, K-SKY has changed formats to Classic rock to Adult Album Alternative (AAA).

The original K-SKY studios were located at 666 Main Street in downtown Deadwood. In 1998, Haugo Broadcasting (owner of KSQY) acquired Rapid City stations KIQK "Kick 104" and KTOQ "K-Talk 1340" from Tom-Tom Communications, then owned by NBC news anchor Tom Brokaw. Soon after the purchase, KSQY moved its studios to Rapid City and joined its new sister stations. In Sept 2008, Haugo Broadcasting moved into its new facilities at 3601 Canyon Lake Drive.
