= KGIM =

KGIM may refer to:

- KGIM (AM), a radio station (1420 AM) licensed to Aberdeen, South Dakota, United States
- KGIM-FM, a radio station (103.7 FM) licensed to Redfield, South Dakota, United States
