= KSDN =

KSDN may refer to:

- KSDN (AM), a radio station (930 AM) licensed to Aberdeen, South Dakota, United States
- KSDN-FM, a radio station (94.1 FM) licensed to Aberdeen, South Dakota, United States
