= KKAA =

- Aberdeen, South Dakota; United States
- Frequency: 1560 kHz
- Branding: Pure Country 107.1 & 99.9

Programming
- Format: Defunct (was Classic country)

Ownership
- Owner: Robert J. Ingstad, Todd Ingstad, and Tallie Colville; (I3G Radio, LLC)

History
- First air date: 1974

Technical information
- Facility ID: 15965
- Class: B
- Power: 10,000 watts (day and night)
- Transmitter coordinates: 45°25′05″N 98°28′36″W
- Translator: 107.1 K296FW (Aberdeen)

Links
- Webcast: Listen Live
- Website: mypurecountry.com

KKAA (1560 AM, "Pure Country 107.1 & 99.9") was a radio station licensed to serve Aberdeen, South Dakota. The station was last owned by Robert J. Ingstad, Todd Ingstad, and Tallie Colville, through licensee I3G Radio, LLC.

== History ==
=== Country music ===
In the summer of 1974, KKAA's transmitter site was constructed 2 miles (3.2 km) south of Aberdeen, next to the waste treatment plant. The 40-acre (160,000 m^{2}) antenna site's ground conductivity was excellent for an AM radio station, as the Aberdeen area is a flood plain, with soil that provides excellent radio wave propagation, and an excellent ground plane. Extensive testing and measuring went into the fine-tuning of the 6 tower, directional antenna array. The original equipment included a custom built antenna phasor built to specs provided by the Harold Munn Radio consulting group, and the original transmitter was a 5,000 watt Continental, phase-modulated, solid-state, which was state of the art at the tme. The transmitter produced so much heat that it was used to warm the building in the winter. By summer's end 1974, the field measurements were done. At night KKAA operated with a highly directional signal that sent most of its signal almost due north at roughly 350 degrees, which provided a strong signal over-the-pole to Moscow, Russia, but also meant it could not be heard in Ipswich, South Dakota.

The FCC signed off for permission to begin normal broadcasting, and the first words heard on KKAA after the station I.D. were by President Gerald Ford welcoming KKAA to the airwaves. The first song played was "Easy Lovin'" by Freddy Hart, followed by "Stand by your man" by Tammy Wynette.

The original on-air format was modern country music, and the station operated 24 hours a day. The staff was from all around the country and the average age was 24 years. The line-up included: David Laustsen, general manager; Jean Laustsen, operations manager; Bard Kallestad, chief engineer & D.J.; Telford Toffelmire, program director,& D.J.; Chuck Timanus, news director; Ray Smith, farm director; Bob Matson, sales director; Jay Jackson, D.J. (morning man); Jeff James, D.J. (drive-time); Jefferson Red (Merle Valness), D.J.(evenings); Lovely-Liz (Elizabeth Epstein), D.J.(grave-yard shift). By the late 1980's, the on air staff included Dick Dunn in the Morning, Barb Johnson in the afternoon, and Jeff Canfield as news director. In 1987 Steve Small took over the morning shift, also acting as Music Director and Program Director. Throughout the late 80s, the Chief Engineer was Jon Thvedt.

Under the mantle of Sunset Broadcasting, the owner of the FCC license was Dakota North Plains Corporation, which owned and operated the Dakota Farmer magazine and other businesses. Local acceptance of the new radio station was overwhelming and commercial sales were very successful. In fact, the price of advertising tripled in just over one year's time. Within three years, the general manager was elected to the South Dakota state legislature and most of the original crew were moving on to other opportunities. One of the people who moved on, was Aberdeen's own Jerry Oster, who migrated to WNAX, where he has held almost every job at the station and is now the news director.

In June 1997, Roberts Radio of Pleasantville, New York, made a deal to acquire KSDN and KSDN-FM to accompany its previous still-pending deal to purchase of KKAA and KQAA-FM. The KKAA/KQAA deal was finalized on July 1, 1997. At the time, KKAA broadcast a country music format and a spokesman for Robert Radio stated they intended to maintain this programming.

In June 2000, Clear Channel purchased Roberts Radio in a deal valued at a reported $65.9 million. Aberdeen radio stations KKAA (1560 AM), KQAA (94.9 FM), KSDN (930 AM), KSDN (94.1 FM) and KBFO (106.7 FM) were part of that deal.

In May 2001, the station added "News and Views with Ed Schultz," a current affairs talk show based at KFGO in Fargo, North Dakota, to its weekday lineup.

=== News/talk ===
In early October 2002, Clear Channel juggled the lineups of KKAA and KSDN to give KKAA a current events talk focus and KSDN a sports talk focus. KKAA shifted from a full-service format mixing country music, agriculture news, and some talk programming to a news and information talk station. On KKAA, Dr. Laura Schlessinger's afternoon advice show was replaced by "The Rush Limbaugh Show", moved over from KSDN. Local morning talk show "Aberdeen Today" was expanded from one to two hours, renamed "Talk of the Town," and moved from KSDN to KKAA. "Tradio," a locally popular show during which listeners call in to buy and sell goods, remained on the Saturday morning schedule. Syndicated commentator Paul Harvey also shifted from KSDN to KKAA. Before the shakeup there was a mix of news, sports, music, and talk shows on each station. KKAA became almost exclusively a news/talk station.

After the format change, the KKAA schedule as of October 2002 was "Coast to Coast AM" with Art Bell from midnight to 5 a.m., business news show "The Wall Street Journal This Morning," at 5 a.m., current events show "America in the Morning" at 6 a.m., Red River Farm Network news show "Country Morning" at 6:30 a.m., local talk show "Talk of the Town" at 7 a.m., "News and Views" with Fargo-based host Ed Schultz at 9 a.m., and local news show "KSDN Midday Report" at 11:30 a.m. This program included the Paul Harvey news and commentary. Afternoon programming began at 1 p.m. with "The Rush Limbaugh Show", continued at 4 p.m. with consumer advocacy show "Troubleshooter Tom Martino," and wrapped up at 6 p.m. with financial advice guru Bruce Williams. Satirical current events host Phil Hendrie completed the night from 9 p.m. to midnight.

=== Religious ===
In August 2004, KKAA was acquired by locally owned Aberdeen Radio Ranch as part of a group sale by Clear Channel Communications. In November 2004, Aberdeen Radio Ranch reached separate agreements to sell KQAA-FM to the Educational Media Foundation, and KKAA (1560 AM) and KQKD (1380 AM) to Family Stations, Inc.

KKAA broadcast Family Radio Ministry programs preparing Aberdeen for the Rapture on May 21, 2011, which predicted that the world would end on October 21, 2011. Family Radio programming, which at the time was dominated by the end-times calculations of its founder, Harold Camping. The network had spent a reported $100 million on a global publicity campaign to warn people of the May 21 date, which Camping later revised to a "spiritual" judgment, with the physical end of the world still scheduled for October 21st.

=== Final years ===
Effective October 31, 2017, Robert Ingstad's KKAA, LLC acquired KKAA and KQKD from Family Stations for $85,000. The stations immediately went silent after that. KKAA was then sold by KKAA, LLC to I3G Radio, LLC effective 31 January 2018 for $60,000.

On January 6, 2020, KKAA returned to the air with a classic country format, branded as "Pure Country 107.1 & 99.9". I3G Media surrendered the station's license on August 10, 2020. As a result, K296FW started simulcasting KSDN-FM.
