= KRWC =

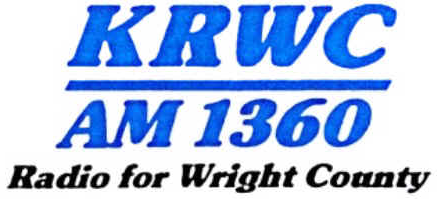
- Buffalo, Minnesota; United States
- Broadcast area: Wright County, Minnesota and surrounding areas
- Frequency: 1360 kHz

Programming
- Format: Full-Service
- Affiliations: NBC News Radio; Linder Farm Network; Minnesota News Network; Motor Racing Network

Ownership
- Owner: Donnell, Inc.

History
- First air date: 1971
- Call sign meaning: Radio Wright County

Technical information
- Licensing authority: FCC
- Facility ID: 17283
- Class: D
- Power: 500 watts day 27 watts night
- Transmitter coordinates: 45°10′00″N 93°55′11″W

Links
- Public license information: Public file; LMS
- Website: krwc1360.com

KRWC (1360 AM) is a radio station licensed to serve Buffalo, Minnesota, United States. The station is owned by Donnell, Inc.

== History ==
KRWC is a heritage "full-service" station licensed to Buffalo, Minnesota. It officially signed on the air on November 11, 1971. The station was founded by Wayne George, who sought to provide a localized alternative to the large Minneapolis-St. Paul signals by focusing exclusively on Wright County news and events. For many years, the station operated as a daytime-only service, signing off at sunset to protect other signals on the 1360 kHz frequency. It transitioned to 24-hour broadcasting on January 1, 2000.

Since KMOM 1070 AM in Monticello, Minnesota went off the air, KRWC is the only radio station in Wright County, Minnesota.

== Programming ==
KRWC broadcasts a full-service format to Wright County and the greater St. Cloud, Minnesota, area. The station broadcasts an oldies/classic hits music format, as well as local news, weather, and sports. The station broadcasts NBC Radio News updates at the top of the hour, as well as content from the Minnesota News Network and Linder Farm Network. The station currently airs NASCAR races from the Motor Racing Network, as well as Minnesota Golden Gophers sports.
