= KMOM =

- Roscoe, South Dakota; United States
- Broadcast area: Aberdeen, South Dakota
- Frequency: 105.5 MHz
- Branding: 105.5 Maverick FM

Programming
- Format: Country
- Affiliations: Minnesota Vikings

Ownership
- Owner: Dakota Broadcasting; (Dakota Broadcasting, LLC)
- Sister stations: KABD

History
- First air date: 2007

Technical information
- Licensing authority: FCC
- Facility ID: 164208
- Class: C1
- ERP: 100,000 watts
- HAAT: 139 meters (456 ft)
- Transmitter coordinates: 45°27′12.9″N 98°48′11.4″W

Links
- Public license information: Public file; LMS
- Webcast: Listen live
- Website: www.dakotabroadcasting.com

KMOM (105.5 FM, "105.5 Maverick FM") is a radio station broadcasting a country music format. Licensed to Roscoe, South Dakota, United States, the station serves the Aberdeen area. The station is owned by Dakota Broadcasting. It airs a mix of new country, classic country and Texas/Red Dirt country. The station, along with KABD, partners with the Aberdeen Area Humane Society for their "Dakota Broadcasting Buddies" program and supports events like "Shop With a Cop".

The call sign was previously used for an AM radio station at 1070 AM licensed to Monticello, Minnesota, United States, which operated during the 1980s and early 1990s.

The station first went on the air in 2007. KMOM had previously been known as "105.5 Dakota Country". On May 23, 2020, the station rebranded to its current moniker, "105.5 Maverick FM". This rebrand was part of a dual station rebranding by Dakota Broadcasting in the Aberdeen market. According to Lucas Quail, the operations manager for Maverick FM, the name was chosen to "pay tribute to the station's outlaw reputation while also signaling a new direction".
