= Aberdeen School District (South Dakota) =

School district in Aberdeen, South Dakota

Address
- 1224 South 3rd Street Aberdeen, South Dakota, 57401; United States

District information
- Grades: K - 12
- Superintendent: Becky Guffin
- School board: Brad Olson (President); Aaron Schultz (VP); Duane Alm; Kevin Burckhard; Andrew Miller; Mark Murphy; Brian Sharp
- NCES District ID: 4602070

Students and staff
- Enrollment: 4,478
- District mascot: "Golden Eagles"

Other information
- Website: Aberdeen School District

The Aberdeen School District (a.k.a. Aberdeen 06-1) is a public school district which serves the southern portion of the city of Aberdeen, Brown County, South Dakota. Responsible for ten schools (including one alternative school), the district is administrated by a hired, full-time superintendent of schools, who reports directly to an elected school board.

== School board ==
The authority and powers of school boards and other officials within school districts in the state of South Dakota are derived directly from SDCL chapter 13–8, despite their constituency being restricted to the district which they serve. SDCL 13–8–39 elaborates that school boards hold "general charge, direction and management of the schools of the district and control and care of all property belonging to it". Resultantly, members of the board report directly to the public, and the state, and do not serve at the pleasure of other state or county authorities.

As of February 2021, Aberdeen's school board consists of seven members elected from the community, one serving as president, and another as vice president.

== Schools ==
As of February 2021, six elementary schools, two middle schools, one high school, and one alternative school are under the purview of the Aberdeen School District.

Aberdeen Schools
Elementary Schools	C.C. Lee Elementary School
	Lincoln Elementary School
	May Overby Elementary School
	Mike Miller Elementary School
	O.M. Tiffany Elementary School
	Simmons Elementary School
Middle Schools	Holgate Middle School
	Simmons Middle School
High School	Central High School
Alternative School	New Beginnings (Grades 5 – 12)

=== Defunct schools ===
- Aberdeen Alternative Middle School
- Hub Area Technical School
