= Ronald Leighty =

American politician

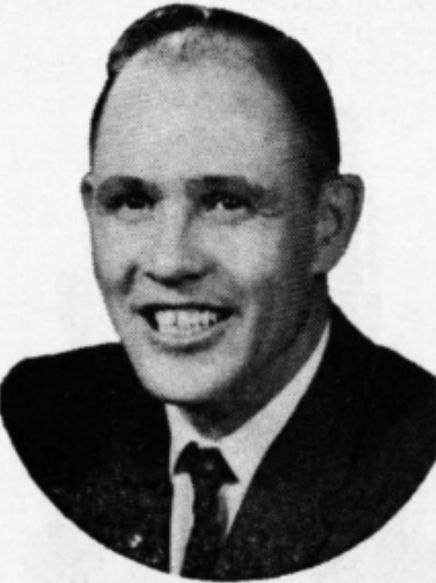
- Leighty in 1965

Member of the South Dakota House of Representatives Brown County
- In office 1963–1966

Personal details
- Born: Ronald Albert Krueger Leighty; August 27, 1930 Aberdeen, South Dakota, U.S.
- Died: November 11, 2022 (aged 92) Aberdeen, South Dakota, U.S.
- Party: Democratic
- Spouse: Marlene Larcher (m. 1955; died. 2021)
- Education: Northern State University

Ronald Albert Krueger Leighty (August 27, 1930 – November 11, 2022) was an American politician. A member of the Democratic Party, he served in the South Dakota House of Representatives from 1963 to 1966.

== Life and career ==
Leighty was born in Aberdeen, South Dakota, the son of Albert Kreuger and Elizabeth Schmaltz. He attended Aberdeen Central High School, graduating in 1948. After graduating, he served in the United States Air Force, which after his discharge, he attended Northern State University, earning his BS degree in business administration in 1958. After earning his degree, he worked as an insurance underwriter.

Leighty served in the South Dakota House of Representatives from 1963 to 1966.

== Personal life and death ==
In 1955, Leighty married Marlene Larcher. Their marriage lasted until her death in 2021.

Leighty died on November 11, 2022, at the Minneapolis Veterans Home in Aberdeen, South Dakota, at the age of 92.
