= KABD =

- Ipswich, South Dakota; United States
- Broadcast area: Aberdeen, South Dakota
- Frequency: 107.7 MHz
- Branding: 107.7 The Shark

Programming
- Format: Adult hits

Ownership
- Owner: Dakota Broadcasting; (Dakota Broadcasting, LLC)
- Sister stations: KMOM

History
- First air date: 2007
- Call sign meaning: K ABerDeen

Technical information
- Licensing authority: FCC
- Facility ID: 164222
- Class: C2
- ERP: 51,000 watts
- HAAT: 108 meters
- Transmitter coordinates: 45°27′13″N 98°48′10″W

Links
- Public license information: Public file; LMS
- Webcast: Listen Live
- Website: Dakota Broadcasting

KABD (107.7 FM) is a radio station broadcasting an adult hits format. Licensed to Ipswich, South Dakota, United States, the station serves the Aberdeen area. The station is currently owned by Dakota Broadcasting.

KABD-FM first went on the air in 2007. The station initially aired a variety hits format. The station and its sister KMOM engage in local community efforts, partnering with the Aberdeen Area Humane Society for their "Dakota Broadcasting Buddies" program and supporting events like "Shop With a Cop".

On May 23, 2020, KABD-FM rebranded as "107.7 The Shark" as part of a dual rebrand with its sister station, KMOM. The new branding signaled a format refinement to "Killer Hits," focusing the music on pop/rock hits primarily from the 1980s and 1990s, with some content from the 1970s and 2000s. Operations Manager Mike Johnson stated the hope was to "modernize the sound... and make that enjoyment more consistent for the listeners".
