= KGIM-FM =

Radio station

- Redfield, South Dakota; United States
- Broadcast area: Aberdeen, South Dakota
- Frequency: 103.7 MHz
- Branding: Pheasant Country 103

Programming
- Format: Country

Ownership
- Owner: Hub City Radio; (Prairie Winds Broadcasting, Inc.)
- Sister stations: KBFO, KGIM, KNBZ, KSDN, KSDN-FM

History
- First air date: May 1, 1997
- Former call signs: KVCY, KQKD-FM

Technical information
- Licensing authority: FCC
- Facility ID: 70081
- Class: C1
- ERP: 100,000 watts
- HAAT: 169 meters (554 feet)
- Transmitter coordinates: 45°12′30″N 98°40′20″W

Links
- Public license information: Public file; LMS
- Website: KGIM-FM Online

KGIM-FM (103.7 FM, "Pheasant Country 103") is a radio station in Aberdeen, South Dakota (licensed to serve Redfield). The station is owned by Prairie Winds Broadcasting, Inc. It airs a country music format.

The station was assigned the KGIM-FM call letters by the Federal Communications Commission on May 1, 1997.

Notable weekday programming includes Brent Nathaniel (6 am – 10 am), Ben Root (10 am – 2 pm), Bri Matthews (2 pm – 7 pm), syndicated The Big Time With Whitney Allen (7 pm – midnight) and After Midnight With Blair Garner (midnight – 6 am). Featured weekend programs include American Country Countdown, Power Source Country and Country Music Greats Radio Show.

KGIM-FM is the radio home of the Aberdeen Roncalli Cavaliers.

== Ownership ==
In mid-1996, KGIM-AM was acquired by Pheasant Country Broadcasting, owned by Robert E. Ingstad and plans were made to launch a 100,000 watt FM counterpart. KGIM-FM 103.7 was launched June 12, 1997 with a country music format and branded Pheasant Country 103.For a time in the late 1990s early 2000s, KGIM-FM simulcasted with KBWS 102.9 FM in Sisseton, South Dakota (excluding 6 am – 10 am) creating a Pheasant Country 103 brand that could be heard across northeast South Dakota, southeast North Dakota & west central Minnesota. This simulcast was ended in the fall of 2004 due to a reorganization by the Ingstad family.

In the fall of 2004, as part of a reorganization by the Ingstad family, Aberdeen Radio Ranch Inc. (Robert J. Ingstad, co-president) agreed to acquire KGIM, KGIM-FM, KNBZ, and KQKD from Robert E. Ingstad (Pheasant Country Broadcasting). The transaction price was not disclosed.

Late 2004, Aberdeen Radio Ranch’s Rob & Todd Ingstad of Valley City, ND signed an agreement to acquire five Clear Channel-Aberdeen, SD stations: KKAA-AM, KSDN-AM/FM, KBFO-FM, KQAA-FM. In separate transactions, Aberdeen Radio Ranch agreed to convey the assets of three of its stations to other companies, leaving the Ingstads with six area stations KGIM-AM/FM, KBFO-FM, KSDN-AM/FM & KNBZ-FM. Sacramento-based Education Media Foundation picked up KQAA-FM. Oakland-based Family Stations acquired KKAA-AM and KQKD-AM. The studios were relocated from the Berkshire Plaza to a newly remodeled south highway 281 building that houses the KSDN-AM/FM transmitters. KGIM-FM retained its country format.

In May 2006, Armada Media Corporation reached an agreement to acquire KBFO, KGIM, KGIM-FM, KNBZ, KSDN, and KSDN-FM from Aberdeen Radio Ranch for a reported $9.25 million.

On November 1, 2013, Prairie Winds Broadcasting, Inc. reached an agreement to acquire KBFO, KGIM, KGIM-FM, KNBZ, KSDN, and KSDN-FM from Armada Media for $5.3 million.
