= Mitchell High School (South Dakota) =

Location
- 920 North Capital Street; Mitchell, South Dakota 57301; United States; 43.7186°N 98.0165°W

Information
- School district: Mitchell School District 17-2
- Principal: Joe Childs
- Teaching staff: 50.89 (FTE)
- Grades: 9–12
- Enrollment: 909 (2023-2024)
  - Grade 9: 213
  - Grade 10: 219
  - Grade 11: 249
  - Grade 12: 228
- Student to teacher ratio: 17.86
- Colors: Black and Gold
- Fight song: On For Mitchell
- Athletics conference: Eastern South Dakota Conference
- Mascot: Cornelius the Kernel
- Nickname: Kernels
- Rival: Huron Tigers
- Feeder schools: Mitchell Middle School
- Website: www.mitchell.k12.sd.us/o/mhs

Mitchell High School is a public high school located in Mitchell, South Dakota. It serves students in grades 9 through 12, and is the only high school in the Mitchell School District.

== History ==
High school classes were held in the Central School until 1909, when a new Mitchell High School was built.

By the 2010s, there was an alternative school, Second Chance HS, for at-risk students that provided a small, more customized learning environment.

== Demographics ==
The location and nature of Mitchell High School is rural. The student body of Mitchell High School is 85 percent white, five percent Native American, five percent Hispanic, one percent African-American, one percent Asian, and three percent of students identify as a part of two or more races.

== Athletics ==
The school athletic teams are the Mitchell Kernels; the moniker was adopted in the 1930s. The school mascot is called Cornelius. Both are references to the Mitchell Corn Palace.

Kernel athletic teams compete in the Eastern South Dakota Conference.

State Championships
Sport	Years
Boys basketball	1932, 1935, 1940, 1948, 1950, 1964, 1984, 1985, 1986, 1990, 1991, 1994, 1996, 1997, 2005, 2024
Football	2016
Girls tennis	2019

== Performing arts ==
In February 2017, MHS opened the largest high school auditorium in the state of South Dakota.

MHS has a competitive show choir, "Friend de Coup". FDC won a national-level competition in 2000 and won the state competition sanctioned by the South Dakota High School Activities Association all three years the contest was held (2016–18). The school also hosts an annual competition.

== Other activities ==
The school student newspaper, The Kernel, was cut due to budgetary pressures in 2017, but remained in publication as a club activity in association with the local regular newspaper The Daily Republic.

== Notable alumni ==
- George McGovern, graduated 1940, U.S. Senator and 1972 Democratic Party presidential nominee
- Mike Miller, graduated 1998, former professional basketball player, coach for the Houston High School, Rookie of the Year, and 2x champion
- Ryan Miller, graduated 1994, college basketball coach
