= KGIM (AM) =

- Aberdeen, South Dakota; United States
- Frequency: 1420 kHz
- Branding: Fox Sports Aberdeen 1420 AM and 98.5 FM

Programming
- Format: Sports
- Affiliations: Fox Sports Radio; Minnesota Twins

Ownership
- Owner: Hub City Radio; (Prairie Winds Broadcasting, Inc.)
- Sister stations: KBFO, KGIM-FM, KNBZ, KSDN, KSDN-FM

History
- First air date: 1952 (as KABR)
- Former call signs: KABR (1952–1980); KDBQ (1980–1982)

Technical information
- Licensing authority: FCC
- Facility ID: 1172
- Class: B
- Power: 1,000 watts day 232 watts night
- Transmitter coordinates: 45°29′12″N 98°29′50″W
- Translator: 98.5 K253AB (Aberdeen)

Links
- Public license information: Public file; LMS
- Webcast: Listen live
- Website: KGIM Online

KGIM (1420 kHz, "FOX Sports Aberdeen 1420 AM and 98.5 FM") is an AM radio station licensed to serve Aberdeen, South Dakota. The station is owned by Prairie Winds Broadcasting, Inc. It airs a sports format featuring programming from Fox Sports Radio.

The station was assigned these call letters by the Federal Communications Commission on June 16, 1982.

KGIM-AM is the radio home for the Aberdeen Central Golden Eagles, Aberdeen Roncalli Cavaliers, Minnesota Vikings and Minnesota Twins.

== Ownership, history, and programming ==
=== First KABR ===
The first KABR began operations in 1935 from the sixth floor of the Alonzo Ward Hotel, with a 100-watt transmitter on the roof of the building and operating at 1430 kHz. By the late 1940s, the station was a Mutual affiliate with 5,000 watts of power on 1420 kHz.

On April 1, 1949, KABR ceased operations. The Mutual affiliate transferred to 930 KSDN, which had begun operations the year before and became the only radio station in Aberdeen.

=== Second KABR ===
The second KABR was licensed on March 11, 1952, to Delbert T. Hunt, who had been the chief engineer at the first KABR. It broadcast during the day on 1220 kHz with 1,000 watts of power. After Delbert Hunt died in 1956, the station was sold to the Yankton Broadcasting Co., which moved the station to 1420. The station was then sold twice in the span of five years, to Frank E. Fitzsimonds in 1959 and Transmedia in 1960. The station had a Top 40 format. Among the personalities on the station was Aberdeen native Wally Wingert, who began his career as a DJ at KABR while in high school.

In 1980, Dakota Broadcasting bought KABR and changed the callsign to KDBQ.

=== As KGIM ===
Dakota Broadcasting sold KDBQ to Alrox, Inc., owned by Allen and Roxanne Rau, in 1982, with the callsign changing to KGIM on June 16 of that year. Rau instituted a full-service/country music format, including regular newscasts, live radio auctions, and other informational programming.

In mid-1996, KGIM was acquired from Allen Rau by Pheasant Country Broadcasting, owned by Robert E. Ingstad. For numerous years, KGIM simulcasted programming with KQKD 1380 AM in Redfield, South Dakota. This simulcast was ended in the fall of 2004 due to the purchase of the five Clear Channel stations.

In the fall of 2004, as part of a reorganization by the Ingstad family, Aberdeen Radio Ranch Inc. (Robert J. Ingstad, co-president) agreed to acquire KGIM, KGIM-FM, KNBZ, and KQKD from Robert E. Ingstad (Pheasant Country Broadcasting). The transaction price was not disclosed. Later in the year, Aberdeen Radio Ranch’s Rob & Todd Ingstad of Valley City, ND signed an agreement to acquire five Clear Channel stations: KKAA AM, KSDN AM/FM, KBFO-FM, and KQAA-FM. Of the total of nine stations, three were then divested: KQAA-FM was sold to the Educational Media Foundation, while Family Stations acquired KKAA and KQKD. The studios were relocated from the Berkshire Plaza to a newly remodeled South Highway 281 building that houses the KSDN-AM/FM transmitters. KGIM’s format was changed to News/Talk and picked up some of the syndicated programs such as Ed Schultz, Rush Limbaugh, and Coast-To-Coast AM that were once carried on KKAA. This News/Talk format was disbanded January 2006 and replaced with solely ESPN Radio programming.

In May 2006, Armada Media Corporation reached an agreement to acquire KBFO, KGIM, KGIM-FM, KNBZ, KSDN, and KSDN-FM from Aberdeen Radio Ranch for a reported $9.25 million. KGIM-AM retained its ESPN Radio programming.

In January 2011 KGIM began airing broadcasts of Minnesota Twins & Minnesota Vikings games which were previously found on sister station KSDN (AM).

In February 2011, Armada Media-Aberdeen, Inc purchased FM translator 107.1, K296FW from Horizon Christian Fellowship for $9,000 and began a rebroadcast of KGIM (AM). On November 1, 2013, Prairie Winds Broadcasting, Inc. reached an agreement to acquire KBFO, KGIM, KGIM-FM, KNBZ, KSDN, and KSDN-FM from Armada Media for $5.3 million.
