= T. F. Riggs High School =

Coordinates: 44.36773°N 100.33849°W

T.F. Riggs High School

Location
- 1010 East Broadway Ave; Pierre, South Dakota 57501; USA

Information
- Type: Public
- Motto: "To Cooperatively Inspire All Students to Achieve Their Potential"
- School district: Pierre School District
- Principal: Kelly Hansen
- Teaching staff: 48.15 (FTE)
- Grades: 9–12
- Enrollment: 855 (2024-2025)
- Student to teacher ratio: 17.76
- Colors: Kelly green and white
- Athletics conference: SDHSAA – ESDC
- Team name: Governors
- Accreditation: NCA
- Newspaper: The Governor
- Yearbook: Gumbo
- Feeder schools: Georgia Morse Middle School
- Website: School website

T. F. Riggs High School, also known simply as Riggs, is the only high school in Pierre, South Dakota. The school mascot is the Pierre Governors. The school has over 800 students and is one of the biggest in South Dakota.

It was named after South Dakota native Dr. Theodore F. Riggs (1874–1962), a Johns Hopkins graduate and local physician.

According to USnews.com, T.F Riggs is the 7th best school in the state of South Dakota, boasting a 94% graduation rate. Riggs also ranks 4th on the College Readiness Index and the College Curriculum Breadth Index. In 2025, the graduating senior class of Riggs was granted a total of over $5 million dollars in scholarships.

== Demographics ==
The student body makeup of the school is 49% male and 51% female. The total minority enrollment is 19%. The student-teacher ratio is 18:1

== Notable alumni ==
- Paul Fuoss, physicist
- Dusty Johnson, member of the United States House of Representatives for South Dakota's at-large congressional district
- Lincoln Kienholz, Louisville Cardinals quarterback
- Scott Rislov, retired Arena Football League quarterback
- Grey Zabel, Seattle Seahawks offensive tackle, first round selection in the 2025 NFL draft
