= Paul Fuoss =

American physicist

- Born: Paul Henry Fuoss; South Dakota, U.S.

Academic background
- Education: South Dakota School of Mines and Technology (BS); Stanford University (PhD)

Academic work
- Discipline: Physics
- Sub-discipline: X-ray scattering Grazing incident scattering
- Institutions: Bell Labs; AT&T Laboratories; Argonne National Laboratory; SLAC National Accelerator Laboratory

Paul Henry Fuoss is an American physicist who specializes in the development of X-ray scattering techniques and their application to materials' physics.

== Early life and education ==
Fuoss was born to parents Floyd and Sylvia Fuoss and raised in South Dakota, where he attended Spears Rural School, followed by Draper High School in Draper and T. F. Riggs High School in Pierre. Fuoss graduated from the South Dakota School of Mines and Technology and completed a doctorate at Stanford University.

== Career ==
Fuoss worked at AT&T Bell Labs, AT&T Laboratories, and the Argonne National Laboratory, then returned to Stanford as a Distinguished Scientist at the SLAC National Accelerator Laboratory in 2017. While at AT&T Laboratories, Fuoss was elected a fellow of the American Physical Society in 1999, "[f]or pioneering contributions to the science of x-ray scattering, including anomalous scattering for amorphous materials, grazing incident scattering to study monolayers on surfaces and in-situ scattering during chemical vapor deposition."
