= KNBZ =

- Redfield, South Dakota; United States
- Broadcast area: Aberdeen, South Dakota
- Frequency: 97.7 MHz
- Branding: Sunny 97.7

Programming
- Format: Adult contemporary
- Affiliations: Compass Media Networks; Premiere Networks; Westwood One

Ownership
- Owner: Hub City Radio; (Prairie Winds Broadcasting, Inc.)
- Sister stations: KBFO, KGIM, KGIM-FM, KSDN, KSDN-FM

History
- First air date: September 2, 1997
- Former call signs: KAWO (7/1997-9/1997)

Technical information
- Licensing authority: FCC
- Facility ID: 84240
- Class: C1
- ERP: 100,000 watts
- HAAT: 171 meters (561 feet)
- Transmitter coordinates: 45°12′30″N 98°40′20″W

Links
- Public license information: Public file; LMS
- Webcast: Listen live
- Website: hubcityradio.com

KNBZ (97.7 FM, "Sunny 97.7") is a radio station in Aberdeen, South Dakota (licensed to serve Redfield). The station is owned by Prairie Winds Broadcasting, Inc. It airs an adult contemporary music format.

The station was assigned the KNBZ call letters by the Federal Communications Commission on September 2, 1997.

Notable weekday programming includes J Krenz (6am-10am), Bri Matthews (10am-2pm), Les Cummings (2pm-7pm) and the syndicated John Tesh program (7pm-Midnight). Featured weekend programs include Backtrax USA, Jim Brickman, The Weekly Pop 20, Dave Koz, The 70's Show with Cindy Barton. The station aired AT 10 with Casey Kasem.

== Ownership, history and programming ==
In mid-1996, KGIM-AM was acquired by Pheasant Country Broadcasting, owned by Robert E. Ingstad and plans were made to launch two 100,000-watt FM counterparts. KGIM-FM 103.7 was launched June 12, 1997 with a country music format and branded Pheasant Country 103. KNBZ-FM 97.7 was launched July 20, 1999 with an Adult AC format and branded Z97. The majority of its programing (excluding a local morning show) came from ABC Radio's Best Hits Best Variety satellite format.

In the fall of 2004, as part of a reorganization by the Ingstad family, Aberdeen Radio Ranch Inc. (Robert J. Ingstad, co-president) agreed to acquire KGIM-AM/FM, KNBZ-FM and KQKD-AM from Robert E. Ingstad (Pheasant Country Broadcasting) The transaction price was not disclosed.

Late 2004, Aberdeen Radio Ranch's Rob and Todd Ingstad of Valley City, ND signed an agreement to acquire five Clear Channel-Aberdeen, SD stations: KKAA-AM, KSDN-AM/FM, KBFO-FM, KQAA-FM. In separate transactions, Aberdeen Radio Ranch agreed to convey the assets of three of its stations to other companies, leaving the Ingstads with six area stations: KGIM-AM/FM, KBFO-FM, KSDN-AM/FM and KNBZ-FM. The Sacramento-based Education Media Foundation picked up KQAA-FM. Oakland-based Family Stations acquired KKAA-AM and KQKD-AM. The studios were relocated from the Berkshire Plaza to a newly remodeled south highway 281 building that houses the KSDN-AM/FM transmitters. KNBZ-FM's format was changed to Oldies and rebranded Kool 97.7 to fill the void of the departed KQAA-FM.

In May 2006, Armada Media Corporation reached an agreement to acquire KBFO, KGIM, KGIM-FM, KNBZ, KSDN, and KSDN-FM from Aberdeen Radio Ranch for a reported $9.25 million. KNBZ-FM's format was changed once again from Oldies to Adult Contemporary and rebranded as Sunny 97.7.

On November 1, 2013, Prairie Winds Broadcasting, Inc. reached an agreement to acquire KBFO, KGIM, KGIM-FM, KNBZ, KSDN, and KSDN-FM from Armada Media for $5.3 million.
