= Eastern South Dakota Conference =

- Conference: SDHSAA
- Founded: 1927
- No. of teams: 10 (12 for football)

The Eastern South Dakota Conference is a high school athletic conference made up of nine teams of Class AA in the East River Region of South Dakota. All schools are members of the SDHSAA. Sports offered are boys & girls basketball, football, boys & girls track & field, boys and girls cross country, volleyball, wrestling, competitive dance & cheer, and, starting in 2012, boys & girls soccer.

== Current members ==
| Team & mascot | School | Enrollment | Year joined |
|---|---|---|---|
| Aberdeen Central Golden Eagles | Central HS | 1,384 | 1927 |
| Brandon Valley Lynx | Brandon Valley HS | 1,381 | 1989 |
| Brookings Bobcats | Brookings HS | 979 | 1927 |
| Harrisburg Tigers | Harrisburg HS | 1,806 | 2012 |
| Huron Tigers | Huron HS | 852 | 1927 |
| Mitchell Kernels | Mitchell HS | 879 | 1927 |
| Pierre T.F. Riggs Governors | T.F.Riggs HS | 855 | 1966 |
| Rapid City Central Cobblers | Central HS | 1,998 | 2015 |
| Rapid City Stevens Raiders | Stevens HS | 1,771 | 2015 |
| Tea Area Titans | Tea Area HS | 717 | 2024 |
| Watertown Arrows | Watertown HS | 1,222 | 1927 |
| Yankton Bucks & Gazelles | Yankton HS | 923 | 1927 |

== Former members ==
| Team & mascot | School | Year joined | Year left |
|---|---|---|---|
| Madison Bulldogs | Madison HS | 1927,1939 | 1935, 1982 |
| Vermillion Tanagers | Vermillion HS | 1930 | 1932 |
| Redfield Pheasants | Redfield HS | 1927 | 1931 |
| Sioux Falls Washington Warriors | Sioux Falls Washington HS | 1927 | 1966 |

== Conference history ==
The Eastern South Dakota Conference consists of eight of the Class AA teams in the East River Region of South Dakota. The conference was established in 1927 and went through many changes as schools only wanted to participate in certain sports. In 1994 Sioux Falls Lincoln, Roosevelt, Washington and O'Gorman were forced to leave the Sioux Interstate Conference with Sioux City, Iowa schools due to the non traditional girls sports seasons. The four schools applied for ESD membership but were denied due to the conference not wanting to expand beyond eight teams, in 1996 The Sioux Falls Schools approached Independent West River Schools Rapid City Central, Rapid City Stevens, Spearfish and Sturgis Brown to form a conference. After several attempts, the Greater Dakota Conference was formed. In the late 2000s West River schools have pushed to join the ESD Conference only to be denied membership, the 2012-2013 school year the Greater Dakota Conference will cease as a new Conference named the Metro Conference will be formed consisting of Sioux Falls Washington, Lincoln, Roosevelt, O'Gorman and Brandon Valley, thereby leaving Rapid City Stevens, Rapid City Central and Sturgis out of a conference. (Spearfish left the GDC for the Black Hills Conference in 2011 due to dropping to Class A.) The Metro Conference was formed due to travel concerns as the distance between Sioux Falls and Rapid City is 396 miles. Brandon Valley and Harrisburg will be in a dual membership with the Metro and ESD Conferences. In 2015 Rapid City Stevens and Central both got into the ESD, only for football. In the 2021–22 season, the football conferences were realigned and Aberdeen Central and Watertown dropped down to 11AA, leaving Brandon, Harrisburg, Stevens, Rapid City Central and the Sioux Falls schools in 11AAA. In football that leaves Aberdeen Central, Brookings, Huron, Mitchell, Pierre, Watertown, and Yankton in 11AA with a couple of other teams. Due to the massive growth to the Sioux Falls area and its schools, there is concern that Brandon and Harrisburg might just become too big for the ESD. In 2023 it was announced that Tea Area would join the ESD in the 2024–25 season, which will move them up to Class AA in all sports.
