= KBFO =

Radio station in Aberdeen, South Dakota

- Aberdeen, South Dakota; United States
- Broadcast area: Aberdeen, South Dakota
- Frequency: 106.7 MHz
- Branding: 106.7 Point FM

Programming
- Format: Adult CHR

Ownership
- Owner: Hub City Radio; (Prairie Winds Broadcasting, Inc.)
- Sister stations: KGIM, KGIM-FM, KNBZ, KSDN, KSDN-FM

History
- First air date: 1998

Technical information
- Licensing authority: FCC
- Facility ID: 9670
- Class: C1
- ERP: 100,000 watts
- HAAT: 136 meters
- Transmitter coordinates: 45°27′57″N 98°20′8″W

Links
- Public license information: Public file; LMS
- Webcast: Listen Live
- Website: KBFO Online

KBFO-FM (106.7 FM, "106.7 Point FM") is a radio station broadcasting an adult CHR music format. Licensed to Aberdeen, South Dakota, United States, the station serves the Aberdeen area. The station is currently owned by Prairie Winds Broadcasting, Inc.

Notable weekday programming includes syndicated Bob & Sheri (5 am – 9 am), Rusty Rokit (9 am – 2 pm), The Dude (2 pm – 7 pm) and syndicated Party Playhouse (6 pm – 11 pm). Syndicated American Top 40, and Open House Party are featured programs on the weekends.

== Ownership, history & programming ==
In 1997, Roberts Radio of Pleasantville, New York, acquired KSDN and KSDN-FM then, in a separate transaction, acquired KKAA-AM and KQAA-FM and made plans to grow the cluster by adding a 100,000 FM station. In the summer of 1998, 106.7 KBFO-FM was launched branded as "The Point“ with its programing coming from the Jones Radio Networks Hot AC satellite format. KBFO-FM studio's were located at the KKAA-AM transmitter site 2 miles south of Aberdeen.

In June 2000, Clear Channel purchased Roberts Radio in a deal valued at a reported $65.9 million. Aberdeen radio stations KKAA (1560 AM), KQAA (94.9 FM), KSDN (930 AM), KSDN (94.1 FM) and KBFO (106.7 FM) were part of that deal.

Late 2004, Aberdeen Radio Ranch’s Rob & Todd Ingstad of Valley City, ND signed an agreement to acquire five Clear Channel-Aberdeen, SD stations: KKAA-AM, KSDN-AM/FM, KBFO-FM, KQAA-FM. In separate transactions, Aberdeen Radio Ranch agreed to convey the assets of three of its stations to other companies, leaving the Ingstads with six area stations KGIM-AM/FM, KBFO-FM, KSDN-AM/FM & KNBZ-FM. Sacramento-based Education Media Foundation picked up KQAA-FM. Oakland-based Family Stations acquired KKAA-AM and KQKD-AM. The studios were relocated from the KKAA-AM transmitter site 2 miles south of Aberdeen to a newly remodeled south highway 281 building that houses the KSDN-AM/FM transmitters. KBFO-FM's dropped the Jones Radio Networks Hot AC satellite format in favor of local based Top 40 (CHR) format.

In May 2006, Armada Media Corporation reached an agreement to acquire KBFO, KGIM, KGIM-FM, KNBZ, KSDN, and KSDN-FM from Aberdeen Radio Ranch for a reported $9.25 million. KBFO-FM maintained its Top 40 (CHR) format. In 2009 KBFO-FM was rebranded as "Point FM".

On November 1, 2013, Prairie Winds Broadcasting, Inc. reached an agreement to acquire KBFO, KGIM, KGIM-FM, KNBZ, KSDN, and KSDN-FM from Armada Media for $5.3 million. The station airs Party Playhouse at night.
