= KSDN (AM) =

Radio station in Aberdeen, South Dakota

- Aberdeen, South Dakota; United States
- Frequency: 930 kHz
- Branding: KSDN 930/102.1

Programming
- Format: News/Talk
- Affiliations: ABC News Radio; Premiere Networks; Westwood One

Ownership
- Owner: Hub City Radio; (Prairie Winds Broadcasting, Inc.)
- Sister stations: KSDN-FM, KBFO, KNBZ, KGIM, KGIM-FM

History
- First air date: April 16, 1947

Technical information
- Licensing authority: FCC
- Facility ID: 25120
- Class: B
- Power: 5,000 watts (day); 1,000 watts (night)
- Transmitter coordinates: 45°25′29″N 98°31′03″W
- Translator: 102.1 K271CN (Aberdeen)

Links
- Public license information: Public file; LMS
- Website: KSDN Online

KSDN (930 kHz) is an AM radio station licensed to serve Aberdeen, South Dakota. The station is owned by Prairie Winds Broadcasting, Inc. It airs a News/Sports/Talk radio format.

930 KSDN carries syndicated The Dave Ramsey Show (radio program), Jim Bohannon Show, Michael Smerconish, Handel on the Law, At Home with Gary Sullivan, Gun Talk & Coast to Coast AM. Notable local programming consists of the KSDN Morning Report from 6-10am with Doc Sebastian & Ben Root. Les Cummings handles the KSDN Midday (11a-1pm) and KSDN Evening (4-6pm) reports.

The station was assigned these call letters by the Federal Communications Commission.

== History and ownership ==
KSDN's license was approved by the Federal Communications Commission June 29, 1948, after which the station began full operation. KSDN was owned by the Aberdeen News Company, publisher of the Aberdeen American-News. Studios were on Main Street in Aberdeen.

In 1997, Roberts Radio of Pleasantville, New York, acquired KSDN and KSDN-FM then, in a separate transaction, acquired KKAA, KKAA-FM, and KQAA-FM. KSDN-AM's studio were moved from the transmitter site on south highway 281 to the KKAA-AM transmitter site 2 miles south of Aberdeen, South Dakota. KSDN-AM's Full Service format was kept.

In June 2000, Clear Channel purchased Roberts Radio in a deal valued at a reported $65.9 million. Aberdeen radio stations KKAA (1560 AM), KQAA (94.9 FM), KSDN (930 AM), KSDN (94.1 FM) and KBFO (106.7 FM) were part of that deal.

In early October 2002, Clear Channel juggled the lineups of KKAA-AM and KSDN-AM. KKAA-AM shifted to a news/talk format and KSDN-AM shifted to a full-time sports talk station with a majority of its programing based out of KFAN-AM Minneapolis, MN "The Fan" .

Late 2004, Aberdeen Radio Ranch’s Rob & Todd Ingstad of Valley City, ND signed an agreement to acquire five Clear Channel-Aberdeen, SD stations: KKAA-AM, KSDN-AM/FM, KBFO-FM, KQAA-FM. In separate transactions, Aberdeen Radio Ranch agreed to convey the assets of three of its stations to other companies, leaving the Ingstads with six area stations KGIM-AM/FM, KBFO-FM, KSDN-AM/FM & KNBZ-FM. Sacramento-based Education Media Foundation picked up KQAA-FM. Oakland-based Family Stations acquired KKAA-AM and KQKD-AM. The studios were relocated from the KKAA-AM transmitter site to a newly remodeled south highway 281 building that houses the KSDN-AM/FM transmitters. Aberdeen Radio Ranch flipped the station's format from "The Fan" to its present News/Talk/Sports format as "Aberdeen's Information Station."

Logo before translator sign on

In May 2006, Armada Media Corporation reached an agreement to acquire KBFO, KGIM, KGIM-FM, KNBZ, KSDN, and KSDN-FM from Aberdeen Radio Ranch for a reported $9.25 million.

On November 1, 2013, Prairie Winds Broadcasting, Inc. reached an agreement to acquire KBFO, KGIM, KGIM-FM, KNBZ, KSDN, and KSDN-FM from Armada Media for $5.3 million.
