= KQKD =

- Redfield, South Dakota; United States
- Broadcast area: Aberdeen, South Dakota
- Frequency: 1380 kHz
- Branding: "KQ1380"

Programming
- Format: Full Service
- Affiliations: Salem Radio Network; Townhall News; Westwood One

Ownership
- Owner: Peter John Radio Plus Streaming; (Gray Ghost Broadcasting)

History
- First air date: 1963 (as KFCB)
- Former call signs: KFCB (1961–1979)

Technical information
- Licensing authority: FCC
- Facility ID: 70083
- Class: D
- Power: 500 watts day 142 watts night
- Transmitter coordinates: 44°53′53″N 98°30′23″W
- Translator: 99.9 K260DG (Redfield)

Links
- Public license information: Public file; LMS
- Webcast: Listen Live
- Website: kq1380.com

KQKD (1380 AM) is a radio station in Redfield, South Dakota (licensed to serve Redfield). The station is licensed to Gray Ghost Broadcasting. It airs a full service format.

The station was assigned these call letters by the Federal Communications Commission on June 4, 1979.

== History ==
On November 16, 1986, a fire destroyed a block of buildings in Redfield, including the studios of KQKD. Four other businesses were destroyed in the fire that left 20 people homeless and killed a 17-month-old girl. The wire story in the San Jose Mercury News included a note that the radio station was then celebrating its 25th anniversary.

In June 1997, station owner Roberts Radio of Pleasantville, New York, told the Aberdeen American News that old equipment at KQKD had been replaced in an effort to improve the sound of the station's programming.

In October 2004, KQKD was acquired by Aberdeen Radio Ranch Inc. (Robert J. Ingstad, co-president) from Robert E. Ingstad as part of a reorganization by the Ingstad family. This deal also included stations KGIM, KGIM-FM, and KNBZ-FM. The price for this four-station deal was undisclosed. According to Broadcasting & Cable, at this time KQKD carried a Country music/Talk radio format.

In November 2004, Aberdeen Radio Ranch reached separate agreements to sell KQAA-FM to the Educational Media Foundation, and KKAA (1560 AM) and KQKD (1380 AM) to Family Stations, Inc.

Effective October 31, 2017 Robert Ingstad's KKAA, LLC acquired KQKD and KKAA from Family Stations for $85,000. KKAA, LLC subsequently sold the station to sister company I3G Radio, LLC for $25,000 effective January 31, 2018.

On January 6, 2020, KQKD changed their format from classic hits to classic country, branded as "Pure Country 107.1 & 99.9".

On April 15, 2021, KQKD was acquired by Gray Ghost Broadcasting. The owners of Gray Ghost are Denise and Ron Schacht former owners of WDLS 93.7 of Dallas, Pennsylvania (now WSJR).

KQKD was changed from a music intensive format to a full service station. Full service radio stations are stations that are not strictly formatted with a specialized program, such as Country, Top 40, Adult Contemporary, Alternative Rock, Talk or Sports. These stations are a mix of all formats but heavily leaning toward extreme localism and serving the local communities. They are usually operated by live staff as opposed to most music and talk stations which are "voice tracked", meaning that the announcer comes in and spends 20 minutes recording his "show" by inserting small voice comments between selected songs. Most talk and sports stations, receive syndicated programming from satellite services with very little local involvement. Generally full service stations are on the AM dial but some can be found on FM and generally they are locally owned as many of the larger conglomerates have all but given up on AM radio. The full service stations concern themselves with anything of a local interest such as high school sports, obituaries, farm news and markets if in a rural area, lost dogs, etc, local news, local guests such as mayors, police, librarians, and anything involving raising money for non profits. Many also run call in type programs such as your opinion shows, swap shops, and the like. You frequently find these stations in small towns that either have no newspaper or a weekly paper and the station fills in the gaps of information for the residents. In most cases the radio station is a companion to the residents and the station personnel are called on to MC local events and help fundraising events, grand openings and similar.

While there is music, it is used as a fill in between features. The music is a combination of country, from the 1960s through current and popular music from the 1950s through the 1990s without disco or rap. Special music programs are composed of Sunday morning hymns, a big band hour and the two hour syndicated Sounds of Sinatra. Farm markets and Dakota News Network are carried daily with a good deal of emphasis on farm and ranch news including Adams on Agriculture. The station also carries Red Eye Radio overnights, a few conservative talk shows at night, an outdoor show and garden shows. Additionally, local high school sports is broadcast, KQKD is the "Voice of the Redfield Pheasants". The station features several local residents and representatives of local organizations to discuss items of interest to the listeners including local obituaries.

Since the only newspaper is a weekly, the radio station fills in the remainder of the week as a source of information. In a nutshell it is 1950s AM radio. The AM station has a very large service area, an approximate 100 mile radius due to the excellent ground conductivity in eastern South Dakota 30. The FM translator operates at 250 watts and has a coverage radius of about 25 miles from the transmitter site.The studio is located at 620 Main St. in Redfield in Suite 8 of the Plaza.The transmitter is located approximately 1 mile north of Redfield near US route 281 In July 2024 KQKD and Gray Ghost Broadcasting was sold to Peter John and his company Radio Plus Streaming. Since that time local programming has ended and been replaced with syndicated talk and music programming running totally automated.
