= Central High School (Aberdeen, South Dakota) =

Public high school in Aberdeen, South Dakota, United States

Coordinates: 45°26′35″N 98°27′27″W

- 2200 S. Roosevelt St. Aberdeen, South Dakota 57401

Information
- Type: Public
- Established: 1903
- School district: Aberdeen School District
- Principal: Jason Uttermark
- Head of school: Becky Guffin, Superintendent
- Staff: 79.93 (FTE)
- Grades: 9–12
- Student to teacher ratio: 17.19
- Colors: Blue & Gold
- Athletics conference: SDHSAA – Eastern South Dakota
- Mascot: Golden Eagles
- School Song: "Notre Dame Victory March"
- Website: Official Website

Central High School is a high school located in Aberdeen, South Dakota with an enrollment of around 1,400 students. Since 2004, the school has been located at a new site located at 2200 South Roosevelt Street, located on the outskirts of the southeast side of town.

The Thomas F. Kelley Theater is the fine arts and multi-purpose venue. The Golden Eagles Arena and the gymnasium have hosted a number of South Dakota High School Activities Association state championship events. Golden Eagle Field is an outdoor football field located on the Central High School Campus. The complex hosts both university and high school events in football, soccer, and track.

Central High School is committed to meeting all requirements under the No Child Left Behind Act and was honored with the Siemens Award for Advanced Placement achievement in math and science in 2008. This award is given to the top performing high school in the state of South Dakota.

Central High School students may earn college credit through the Rising Scholars Program or one of the many Advanced Placement opportunities available. Central High School partners with the Hub Area Vocational School to offer a large number of vocational learning experiences.

== Athletics ==
Central athletic teams are nicknamed the Golden Eagles. The school competes in boys' football, basketball, wrestling, track, cross-country, tennis, golf, and soccer. Girls compete in volleyball, basketball, track, cross country, gymnastics, tennis, golf, competitive cheer and dance, and soccer.

State Championships
Sport	Years
Boys Basketball	1913, 1933, 1938, 1949, 1953, 1961, 1977, 1988
Boys Track	2002
Girls Basketball	2002, 2009, 2015
Girls Volleyball	2016, 2018
Wrestling	2014

Central High School competes in the Eastern South Dakota Athletic Conference. Students can also participate in numerous clubs and activities on campus, including drama, band, chorus, speech and debate, e-sports, art club, environmental club, G.S.A. club, fiddle club, club America, H.O.S.A, theater, and oral interpretation.

== Speech and Debate ==
Aberdeen Central has won 9 team state championships in Speech and Debate (2004, 2006, 2007, 2009, 2012, 2013, 2014, 2015, 2017, 2018, 2019, 2020, 2021, 2022, 2023, and 2024, the most of any school in South Dakota. The 8 consecutive team state championships won from 2017 to 2024 marks the longest consecutive win streak in class AA SDHSAA history.

Aberdeen Central was awarded the National Speech and Debate Association's Debate School of Excellence Award in 2014 and 2015, recognizing it as one of the top 20 debate schools in the nation. Aberdeen Central is 1 of only 3 schools (along with Bellaire High School of Texas & Durham Academy of North Carolina) to have ever won the award in back to back years.

Head Speech & Debate Coach Kerry Konda was awarded the National Speech & Debate Association's James M. Copeland High School Coach of the Year award in 2024.

Students from Aberdeen Central compete in all events sanctioned by the South Dakota High School Activities Association and National Speech and Debate Association including: Policy Debate, Lincoln Douglas Debate, Public Forum Debate, Original Oratory, Extemporaneous Speaking, Oral Interpretation, and Student Congress.

Aberdeen Central has won the state championship in Policy Debate four times (1965, 1997, 2008, 2010).

Aberdeen Central has won the state championship in Lincoln Douglas four times (2012, 2013, 2019, & 2024).

Aberdeen Central has won the state championship in Public Forum six times (2006, 2013, 2014, 2016, 2020, 2023, ).

Aberdeen Central has won the state championship in Original Oratory thirteen times (1954, 1961, 1991, 2002, 2007, 2008, 2009, 2010, 2017, 2018, 2020, 2023, 2024,).

Aberdeen Central has won the state championship in International Extemporaneous Speaking seven times (2001, 2004, 2007, 2008, 2012 2017, 2023).

Aberdeen Central has won the state championship in U.S. Extemporaneous Speaking seven times (1988, 2007, 2008, 2018, 2021, 2022, 2024).

Aberdeen Central has won the state championship in Informative Speaking two times (2021-inaugural year, 2023)

== Music Wing ==
- Orchestra
- Band
- Marching band
- Choir
- All state

== School leadership ==
- Jason Uttermark, Principal
- Tina Board, Asst. Principal
- Kent Hansen, Asst. Principal

== Notable alumni ==
- Tom Daschle, (Class of 1965); former U.S. Senator and Senate Majority Leader
- Josh Heupel, quarterback for the 2000 National Champion Oklahoma Sooners football team, and head coach of the Tennessee Volunteers
- Brian Hoke, Navy SEAL and CIA paramilitary officer
- Ronald Leighty, politician
- Taylor Mehlhaff, NFL kicker
- Dean M. Peterson, developer of Instamatic and point-and-shoot cameras
- Eddie Spears, film actor and model
- Michael Spears, film actor and model
