= KSDN-FM =

- Aberdeen, South Dakota; United States
- Broadcast area: Aberdeen, South Dakota
- Frequency: 94.1 MHz (HD Radio)
- Branding: 94.1 The Rock

Programming
- Format: Active rock
- Subchannels: HD2: Pure Country 107.1 (Classic country); HD3: 94.5 The Vault (Classic Hits)
- Affiliations: Compass Media Networks; United Stations Radio Networks; Aberdeen Wings

Ownership
- Owner: Hub City Radio; (Prairie Winds Broadcasting, Inc.)
- Sister stations: KBFO, KGIM, KGIM-FM, KNBZ, KSDN

History
- First air date: September 14, 1978

Technical information
- Licensing authority: FCC
- Facility ID: 25118
- Class: C1
- ERP: 59,000 watts
- HAAT: 134 meters (440 feet)
- Transmitter coordinates: 45°25′26″N 98°31′1″W
- Translators: HD2: 107.1 K296FW (Aberdeen); HD3: 94.5 K233BN (Aberdeen)

Links
- Public license information: Public file; LMS
- Webcast: Listen Live; Listen Live (HD2); Listen Live (HD3)
- Website: KSDN-FM Online; KSDN-HD2 Online; KSDN-HD3 Online

KSDN-FM (94.1 MHz, "The Rock 94.1 FM") is a radio station licensed to serve Aberdeen, South Dakota. The station is owned by Prairie Winds Broadcasting, Inc. It airs an active rock music format.

The station was assigned the KSDN-FM call letters by the Federal Communications Commission on September 14, 1978.

Notable on-air personalities include Rusty Rokit (6 am – 10 am), Brent Nathaniel (10 am – 2 pm), Doc Sebastian (2 pm – 7 pm) and Les Cummings (7 pm – midnight). Plus syndicated Dee Snider's House Of Hair & Hard Drive.

94.1 The Rock is the radio home of the Northern State University Wolves.

== Ownership, history and programming ==
In 1997, Roberts Radio of Pleasantville, New York, acquired KSDN and KSDN-FM then, in a separate transaction, acquired KKAA, KKAA-FM, and KQAA-FM. KSDN-FM's studio were moved from the transmitter site on south highway 281 to the KKAA-AM transmitter site 2 miles south of Aberdeen, South Dakota. The station was rebranded from "Rock 94" to its original slogan "94.1 The Rock" and ABC Radio's Classic Rock Experience 24-hour satellite format was added.

In June 2000, Clear Channel purchased Roberts Radio entire assets including the 5 Aberdeen station in a deal valued at a reported $65.9 million. Aberdeen radio stations KKAA (1560 AM), KQAA (94.9 FM), KSDN (930 AM), KSDN (94.1 FM) and KBFO (106.7 FM) were part of that deal. KSDN-FM retained its Classic Rock format.

Late 2004, Aberdeen Radio Ranch’s Rob & Todd Ingstad of Valley City, ND signed an agreement to acquire five Clear Channel-Aberdeen, SD stations: KKAA-AM, KSDN-AM/FM, KBFO-FM, KQAA-FM. In separate transactions, Aberdeen Radio Ranch agreed to convey the assets of three of its stations to other companies, leaving the Ingstads with six area stations KGIM-AM/FM, KBFO-FM, KSDN-AM/FM & KNBZ-FM. Sacramento-based Education Media Foundation picked up KQAA-FM. Oakland-based Family Stations acquired KKAA-AM and KQKD-AM. The studios were relocated from the KKAA-AM transmitter site 2 miles south of Aberdeen to the remodeled original studio location which housed the KSDN-AM/FM transmitter on south highway 281. ABC Radio's Classic Rock Experience was dropped in favor of local programing. KSDN-FM's format also changed from Classic rock to Mainstream Rock.

In May 2006, Armada Media Corporation reached an agreement to acquire KBFO, KGIM, KGIM-FM, KNBZ, KSDN, and KSDN-FM from Aberdeen Radio Ranch for a reported $9.25 million. KSDN-FM maintained its Mainstream Rock format.

On November 1, 2013, Prairie Winds Broadcasting, Inc. reached an agreement to acquire KBFO, KGIM, KGIM-FM, KNBZ, KSDN, and KSDN-FM from Armada Media for $5.3 million.
