= KMOM (Minnesota) =

Radio station in Monticello, Minnesota, US

- Monticello, Minnesota; United States
- Frequency: 1070 kHz

Ownership
- Owner: Prime Factors Communications, Inc.

History
- First air date: March 9, 1982
- Last air date: 1995

Technical information
- Facility ID: 53518
- Class: B
- Power: 10,000 watts (day); 2,500 watts (night)
- Transmitter coordinates: 45°16′53″N 93°50′21″W

KMOM (1070 AM) was a radio station in Monticello, Minnesota, United States, that operated between 1982 and 1995. The station operated on a frequency of 1070 kHz with a daytime power of 10,000 watts. The station was owned and operated by Prime Factors Communications, Inc., with Gregory C. Davis serving as the general manager. Its studio was located at the intersection of County Road 117 and County Road 106 in Monticello.

== History ==
The station's construction permit was originally granted by the Federal Communications Commission (FCC) to Tri-County Radio on April 8, 1981. The station went on the air on March 9, 1982, seeking to fill what its founding owners believed was an unmet need for local radio in the area between the Twin Cities and St. Cloud. It offered an adult contemporary format with local information and Twin Cities traffic for commuters, broadcasting with 10,000 watts during the day and 2,500 at night. KMOM was a near-immediate financial failure. Mike Diem, who had been the manager when KMOM began in March, was fired in November by station president Ross Eggestein over objections to planned cutbacks. One source told the St. Cloud Daily Times that the station was losing $10,000 a month. In December, KMOM filed for Chapter 11 bankruptcy protection. While owner Tri-County Radio sought a buyer, the federal trustee assigned to the case filed to convert the filing to a Chapter 7 liquidation. A sale was agreed to a group of Twin Cities investors, which stockholders threatened to block. People close to the station cited Eggestein's lack of experience in broadcasting and a costly delay in building the facility.

In November 1983, an investor group led by Dave Lund and including professional hockey player Jim Korn acquired KMOM for $515,000. It switched to a country music format. Financial problems and a lack of sufficient advertising revenue put it off the air on June 20, 1988. Greg Davis of Plymouth bought KMOM through his company, Prime Factors Communications, and returned it to the air later that year. It was no longer on the air by February 1993. It briefly went back on the air by July that year but left the air again in 1995. Its broadcast license was deleted by the FCC the next year for being silent for more than a year.
