= Aberdeen, South Dakota =

Aberdeen, South Dakota Ablíla
- City
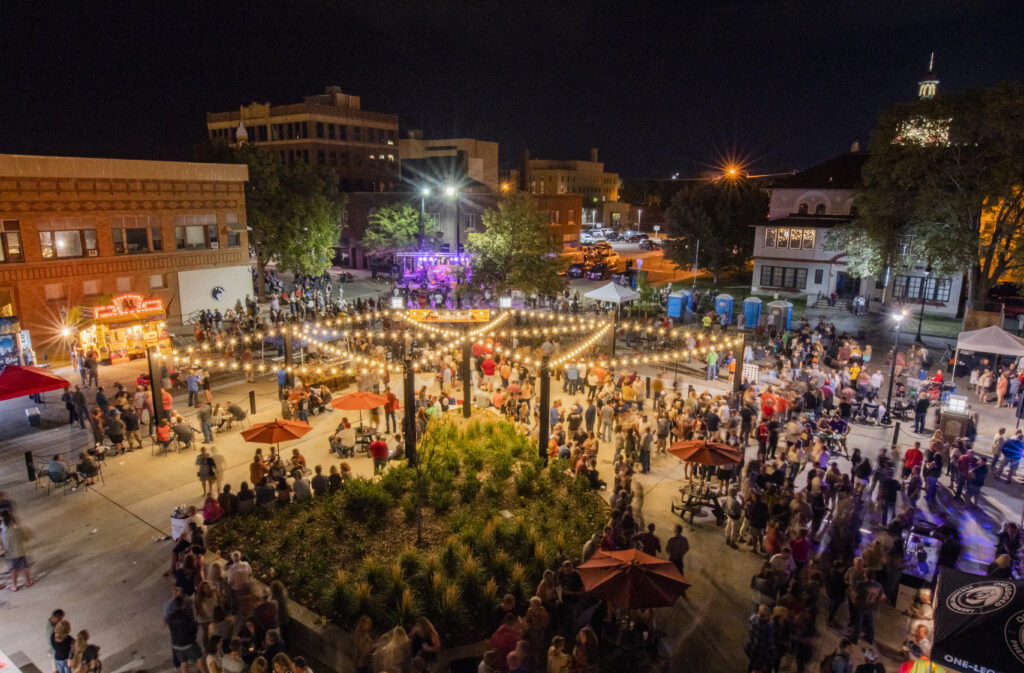
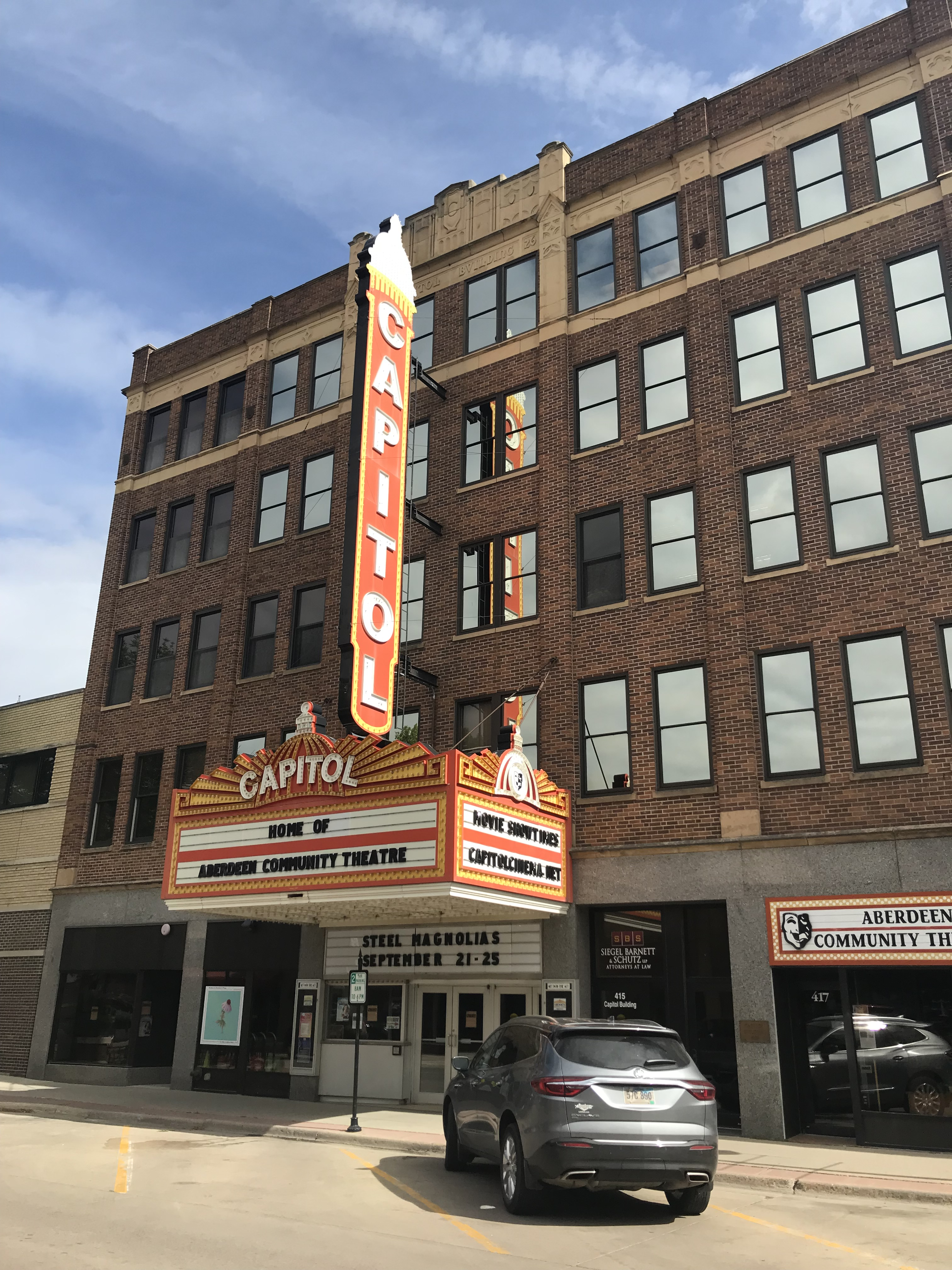
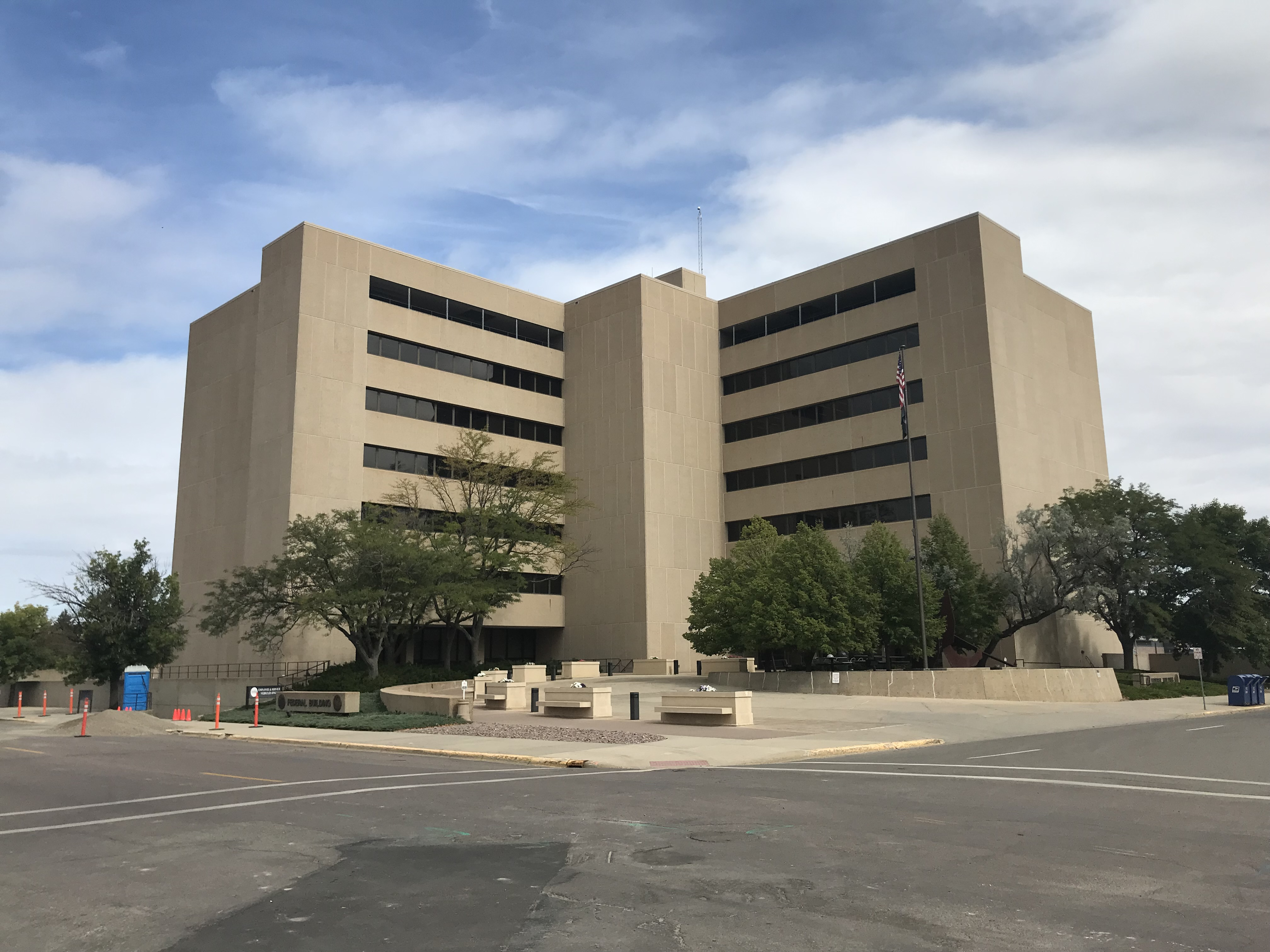
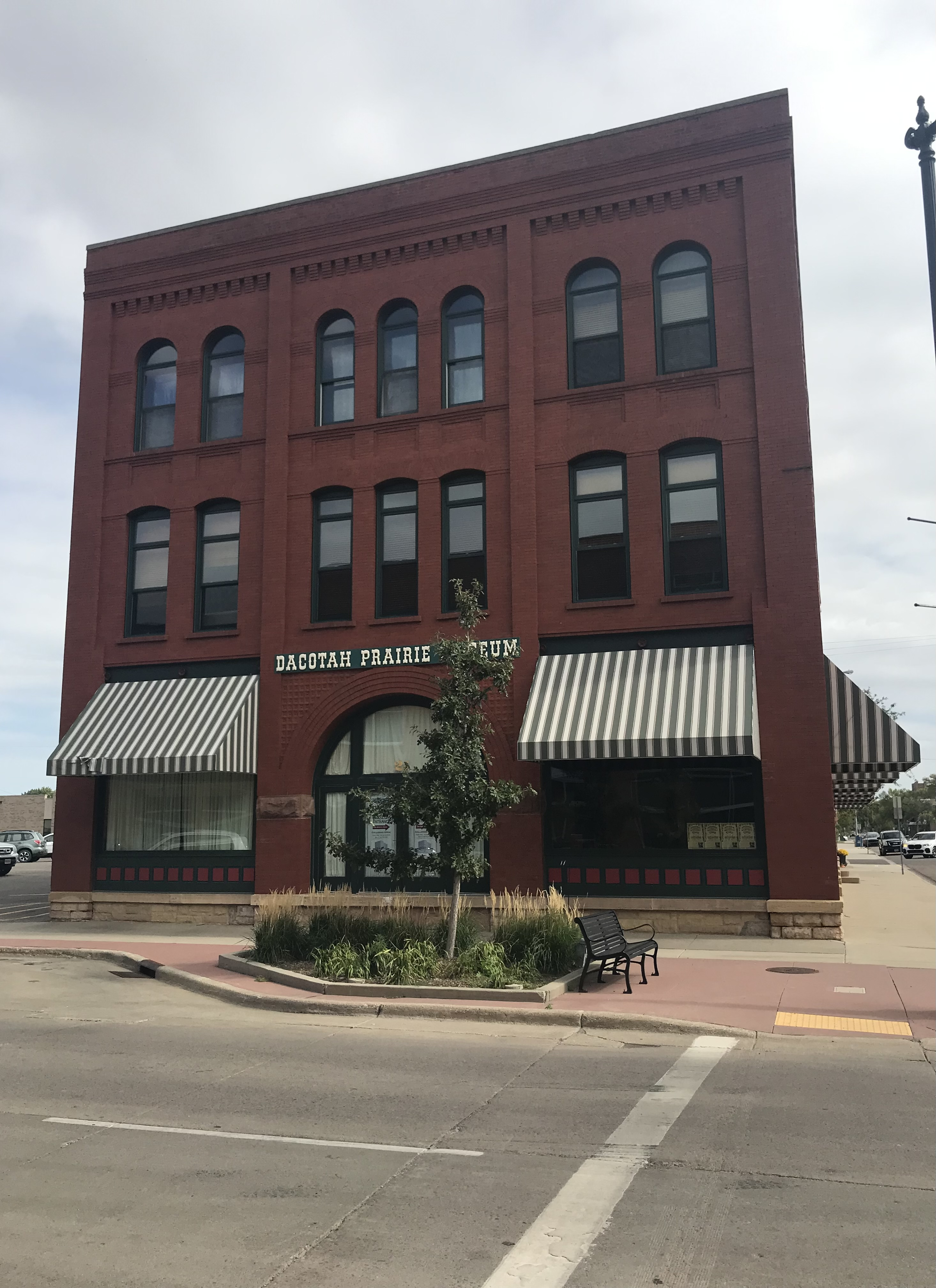
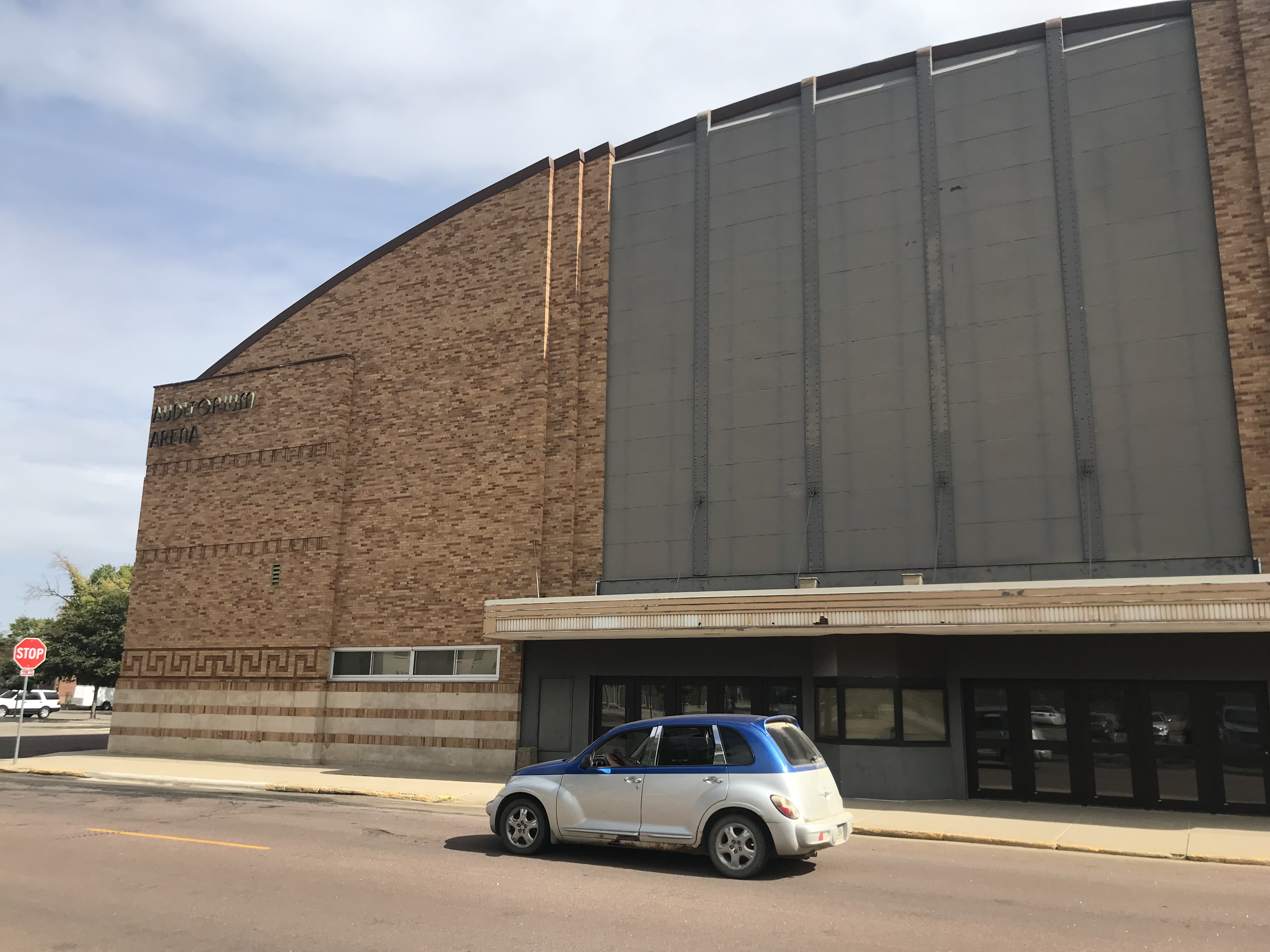
- Downtown (Malchow Plaza) Capitol Theatre Aberdeen Federal Building Dacotah Prairie Museum Aberdeen Civic Arena

- Flag Seal

- Location of Aberdeen

- Location within South Dakota Location within the United States
- Coordinates: 45.464678°N 98.468104°W
- Country: United States
- State: South Dakota
- County: Brown
- Established: June 15, 1879
- Settled: 1880
- Incorporated (town): July 6, 1881
- Incorporated (city): May 8, 1882

Government
  - Mayor: Travis Schaunaman
  - City manager: David McNeal

Area
  - City: 16.652 sq mi (43.128 km^{2})
  - Land: 16.574 sq mi (42.927 km^{2})
  - Water: 0.078 sq mi (0.203 km^{2}) 0.47%
- Elevation: 1,299 ft (396 m)

Population (2020)
  - City: 28,495
  - Estimate (2024): 27,919
  - Rank: US: 1433rd SD: 3rd
  - Density: 1,684.5/sq mi (650.39/km^{2})
  - Urban: 27,982
  - Metro: 41,522 (US: 306th)
- Demonym: Aberdonian
- Time zone: UTC–6 (Central (CST))
  - Summer (DST): UTC–5 (CDT)
- ZIP Codes: 57401–57402
- Area code: 605
- FIPS code: 46-00100
- GNIS feature ID: 1267258
- Highways: US 12, US 281
- Website: aberdeen.sd.us

Aberdeen (Lakota: Ablíla) is a city in and the county seat of Brown County, South Dakota, United States. The population was 28,495 at the 2020 census, and was estimated to be 27,919 in 2024, making it the third-most populous city in the state. Aberdeen is home of Northern State University.

== History ==
=== Settlement ===
Before Aberdeen or Brown County was inhabited by European settlers, it was inhabited by the Sioux Indians from approximately 1700 to 1879. Europeans entered the region for business, founding fur trading posts during the 1820s; these trading posts operated until the mid-1830s. The first "settlers" of this region were the Arikara Indians, but they would later be joined by others.

The first group of Euro-American settlers to reach the area that is now Brown County was a party of four people, three horses, two mules, fifteen cattle, and two wagons. This group of settlers was later joined by another group the following spring, and, eventually, more settlers migrated toward this general area, currently known as Columbia, South Dakota. This town was established on June 15, 1879, was settled in 1880, and was incorporated in 1882.

=== Creation of the town ===
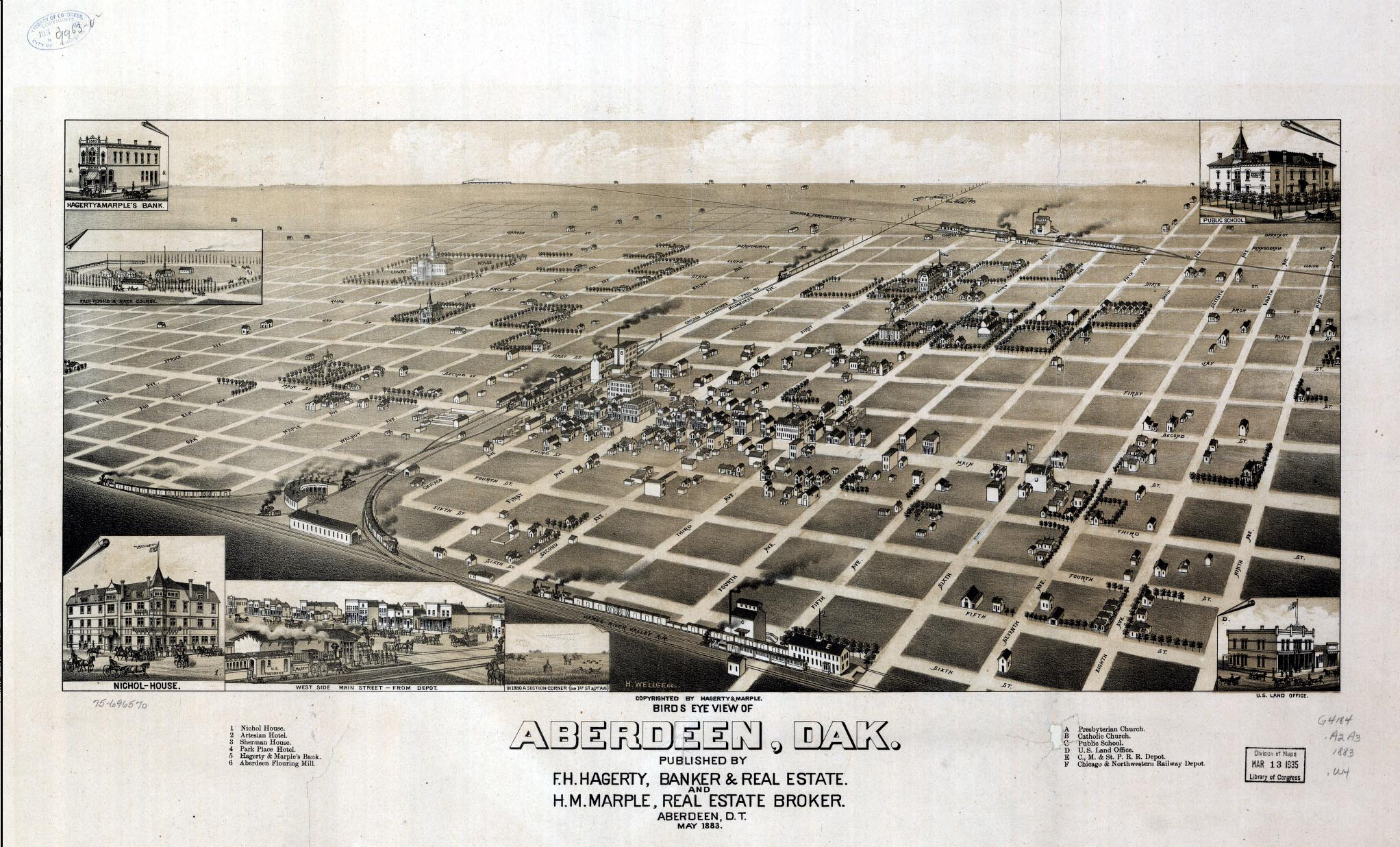
1883 illustration of Aberdeen

Aberdeen, like many towns of the Midwest, was built around the newly developing railroad systems. Aberdeen was first officially plotted as a town site on January 3, 1881, by Charles Prior, the superintendent of the Minneapolis office of the Chicago, Milwaukee, and St. Paul Railroad, or the Milwaukee Road for short, which was presided over by Alexander Mitchell, Charles Prior's boss, who was responsible for the choice of town names. He was born in Aberdeen, Scotland, after which the town of Aberdeen was named. Aberdeen was officially founded on July 6, 1881, the date of the first arrival of a Milwaukee Railroad train. Aberdeen then operated under a city charter granted by the Territorial Legislature in March 1883.

As Aberdeen grew, many businesses and buildings were constructed along the town's Main Street. However, this soon became a problem due to Aberdeen's periodic flooding, which led to it being referred to as "The Town in the Frog Pond". At first, this unique condition presented no problem to the newly constructed buildings because it had not rained very much but, when heavy rains fell, the Pond reappeared and flooded the basements of every building on Main Street, causing many business owners and home owners much turmoil. When this flooding happened, the city had one steam-powered pump that had to be used to dry out the entire area that had been flooded, which would take days, if not weeks – and more often than not, it would have rained again in this time period and caused even more flooding, even in the basements that had already been emptied of the water. When the water was gone from the basements, the city still had to deal with the mud that also resulted from the heavy rains.

The city decided in 1882 to build an artesian ditch to control the "Frog Pond" effects; the plan was later upgraded and developed into an artesian well in 1884 to combat the heavy rains and keep the basements from flooding. The artesian well was designed by the city engineers to prevent flooding and develop a water system. However, during the digging of the well, the water stream that was found underground was too powerful to be contained. The water came blasting out with violent force and had the entire Main Street submerged in up to four feet of water. The engineers realized the previous flaws of the artesian well plan and soon added a gate valve to the well to control the flow of water, giving Aberdeen its first working water supply.

Aberdeen had four different railroad companies with depots built in the newly developing town. With these four railroads intersecting here, Aberdeen soon became known as the "Hub City of the Dakotas". When looking down on Aberdeen from above, the railroad tracks converging in Aberdeen resembled the spokes of a wheel converging at a hub, hence the name "Hub City of the Dakotas". These four railroad companies are the reason why Aberdeen was able to grow and flourish as it did. The only railroad still running through Aberdeen is the BNSF Railway.

L. Frank Baum, who was later author of the book The Wonderful Wizard of Oz and its many sequels, lived here with his wife and children from 1888 to 1891. He ran a fancy goods store, Baum's Bazaar, for over a year, which failed. He later published one of the city's then nine newspapers, where he used his editorials to campaign for women's suffrage (a suffrage amendment to the new South Dakota constitution was on the ballot at the time). The city's small amusement park has some features reflective of the Oz series. After his sojourn in Aberdeen, he moved to Chicago in 1892.

Five sitting Presidents of the United States have visited Aberdeen: William McKinley in 1899, Theodore Roosevelt in 1903, William Howard Taft in 1911, Franklin D. Roosevelt in 1936, and George W. Bush in 2002.Presidential visits to South Dakota (updated)

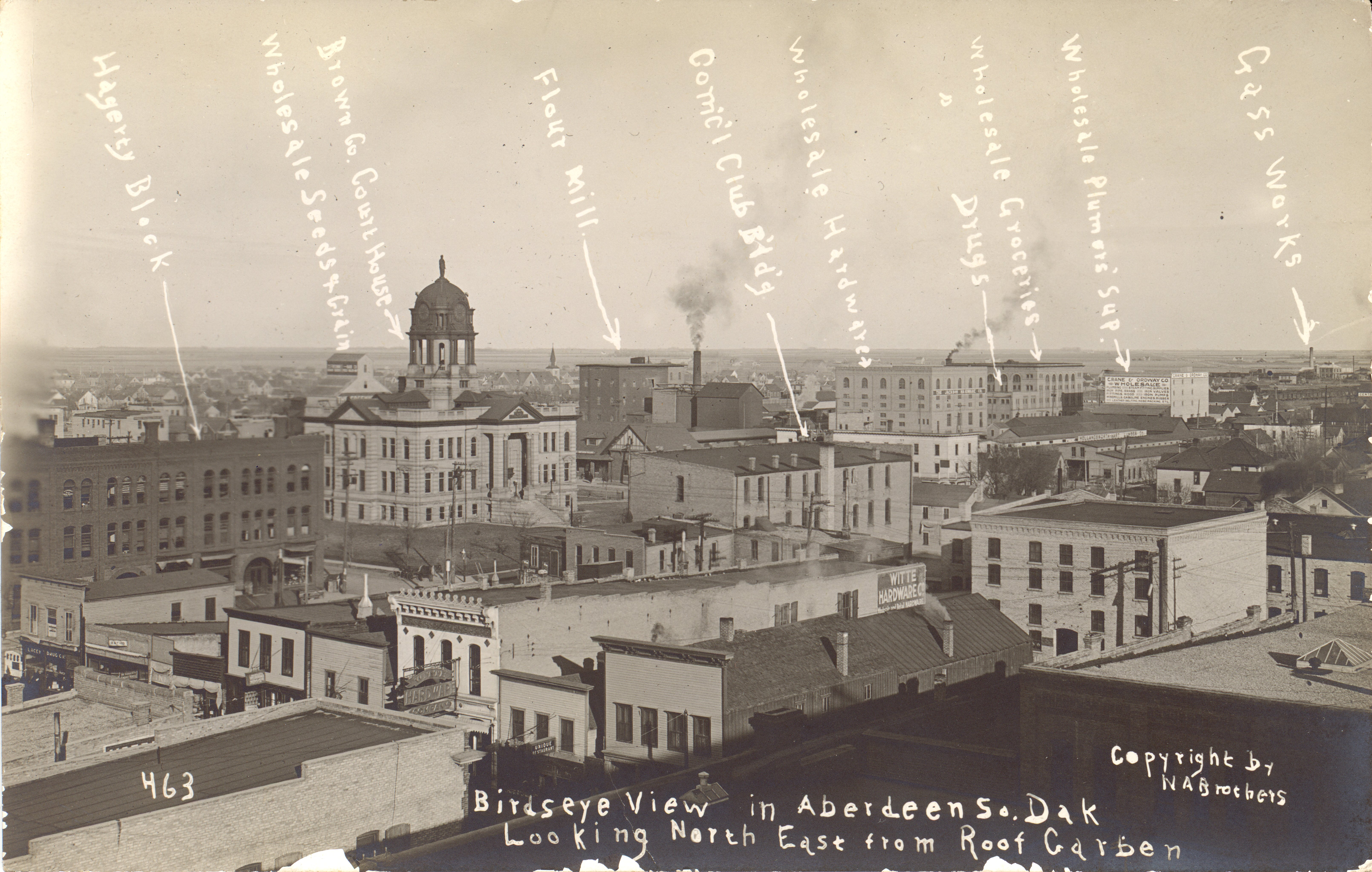
Labeled photograph of downtown Aberdeen, 1910

== Geography ==
Aberdeen is located in northeastern South Dakota, in the James River valley, approximately 11 miles (18 km) west of the river. The James River enters northeastern South Dakota in Brown County, where it is dammed to form two reservoirs northeast of Aberdeen. The city is bisected by Moccasin Creek, a slow-moving waterway which flows south and then northeast to the James River.

According to the United States Census Bureau, the city has a total area of 16.652 square miles (43.13 km^{2}), of which 16.574 square miles (42.93 km^{2}) is land and 0.078 square miles (0.20 km^{2}) (0.47%) is water.

=== Climate ===
Aberdeen experiences a humid continental climate (Köppen Dfa) influenced by its position far from moderating bodies of water. This brings four distinct seasons, a phenomenon that is characterized by hot, relatively humid summers and cold, dry winters, and it lies in USDA Hardiness Zone 4a. The monthly daily average temperature ranges from 12.8 °F (−10.7 °C) in January to 72.3 °F (22.4 °C) in July, while there are 16 days of 90 °F (32 °C)+ highs and 38 days with sub-0 °F (−18 °C) lows annually. Snowfall occurs mostly in light to moderate amounts during the winter, totaling 42 inches (107 cm). Precipitation, at 21.8 inches (554 mm) annually, is concentrated in the warmer months. Extreme temperatures have ranged from −46 °F (−43 °C) on January 12, 1912, and February 8, 1895, to 115 °F (46 °C) on July 6 and 15, 1936, although a −42 °F (−41 °C) reading occurred as recently as January 15, 2009.

Climate data for Aberdeen, South Dakota (Aberdeen Regional Airport), 1991–2020 normals, (Note: Mean monthly maxima and minima (i.e. the expected highest and lowest temperature readings at any point during the year or given month) calculated based on data at said location from 1991 to 2020.) extremes 1893–present
| Month | Jan | Feb | Mar | Apr | May | Jun | Jul | Aug | Sep | Oct | Nov | Dec | Year |
|---|---|---|---|---|---|---|---|---|---|---|---|---|---|
| Record high °F (°C) | 63 (17) | 70 (21) | 86 (30) | 98 (37) | 110 (43) | 112 (44) | 115 (46) | 112 (44) | 107 (42) | 96 (36) | 79 (26) | 69 (21) | 115 (46) |
| Mean maximum °F (°C) | 44.6 (7.0) | 47.5 (8.6) | 64.5 (18.1) | 81.1 (27.3) | 89.2 (31.8) | 93.4 (34.1) | 95.9 (35.5) | 93.4 (34.1) | 90.2 (32.3) | 81.4 (27.4) | 64.2 (17.9) | 46.6 (8.1) | 98.0 (36.7) |
| Mean daily maximum °F (°C) | 23.7 (−4.6) | 28.6 (−1.9) | 41.7 (5.4) | 57.6 (14.2) | 70.4 (21.3) | 80.2 (26.8) | 84.9 (29.4) | 82.9 (28.3) | 74.9 (23.8) | 59.3 (15.2) | 42.5 (5.8) | 28.7 (−1.8) | 56.3 (13.5) |
| Daily mean °F (°C) | 12.8 (−10.7) | 17.5 (−8.1) | 30.5 (−0.8) | 44.5 (6.9) | 57.3 (14.1) | 67.6 (19.8) | 72.3 (22.4) | 69.7 (20.9) | 60.9 (16.1) | 46.3 (7.9) | 30.9 (−0.6) | 18.3 (−7.6) | 44.0 (6.7) |
| Mean daily minimum °F (°C) | 1.9 (−16.7) | 6.3 (−14.3) | 19.4 (−7.0) | 31.4 (−0.3) | 44.3 (6.8) | 55.1 (12.8) | 59.7 (15.4) | 56.5 (13.6) | 46.8 (8.2) | 33.3 (0.7) | 19.4 (−7.0) | 7.9 (−13.4) | 31.8 (−0.1) |
| Mean minimum °F (°C) | −24.3 (−31.3) | −18.2 (−27.9) | −5.6 (−20.9) | 14.7 (−9.6) | 28.4 (−2.0) | 42.4 (5.8) | 47.6 (8.7) | 43.8 (6.6) | 29.8 (−1.2) | 15.8 (−9.0) | 0.1 (−17.7) | −16.6 (−27.0) | −28.1 (−33.4) |
| Record low °F (°C) | −46 (−43) | −46 (−43) | −32 (−36) | −6 (−21) | 13 (−11) | 28 (−2) | 35 (2) | 30 (−1) | 11 (−12) | −6 (−21) | −27 (−33) | −39 (−39) | −46 (−43) |
| Average precipitation inches (mm) | 0.55 (14) | 0.62 (16) | 0.89 (23) | 1.91 (49) | 3.28 (83) | 3.76 (96) | 3.09 (78) | 2.24 (57) | 1.99 (51) | 2.14 (54) | 0.74 (19) | 0.61 (15) | 21.82 (554) |
| Average snowfall inches (cm) | 7.8 (20) | 8.6 (22) | 6.3 (16) | 4.2 (11) | 0.0 (0.0) | 0.0 (0.0) | 0.0 (0.0) | 0.0 (0.0) | 0.0 (0.0) | 1.3 (3.3) | 6.5 (17) | 8.0 (20) | 42.7 (108) |
| Average extreme snow depth inches (cm) | 8.1 (21) | 8.7 (22) | 7.6 (19) | 2.7 (6.9) | 0.0 (0.0) | 0.0 (0.0) | 0.0 (0.0) | 0.0 (0.0) | 0.0 (0.0) | 0.7 (1.8) | 3.8 (9.7) | 6.7 (17) | 12.9 (33) |
| Average precipitation days (≥ 0.01 in) | 7.1 | 7.0 | 7.7 | 8.1 | 10.4 | 11.5 | 10.1 | 8.1 | 7.7 | 7.6 | 6.1 | 6.9 | 98.3 |
| Average snowy days (≥ 0.1 in) | 7.9 | 6.9 | 5.1 | 2.0 | 0.0 | 0.0 | 0.0 | 0.0 | 0.0 | 1.2 | 4.2 | 6.9 | 34.2 |
| Average relative humidity (%) | 72.8 | 74.1 | 73.4 | 64.9 | 62.4 | 67.3 | 64.4 | 63.5 | 66.3 | 67.3 | 75.1 | 76.3 | 69.0 |
| Average dew point °F (°C) | 3.4 (−15.9) | 10.9 (−11.7) | 21.9 (−5.6) | 32.4 (0.2) | 43.2 (6.2) | 54.7 (12.6) | 58.8 (14.9) | 55.8 (13.2) | 45.9 (7.7) | 35.1 (1.7) | 22.1 (−5.5) | 9.7 (−12.4) | 32.8 (0.4) |
Source: NOAA (relative humidity and dew point 1964–1990)

== Demographics ==
Historical population
| Census | Pop. | Note | %± |
|---|---|---|---|
| 1890 | 3,182 | | — |
| 1900 | 4,087 | | 28.4% |
| 1910 | 10,753 | | 163.1% |
| 1920 | 14,537 | | 35.2% |
| 1930 | 16,465 | | 13.3% |
| 1940 | 17,015 | | 3.3% |
| 1950 | 21,061 | | 23.8% |
| 1960 | 23,073 | | 9.6% |
| 1970 | 26,476 | | 14.7% |
| 1980 | 25,851 | | −2.4% |
| 1990 | 24,927 | | −3.6% |
| 2000 | 24,658 | | −1.1% |
| 2010 | 26,091 | | 5.8% |
| 2020 | 28,495 | | 9.2% |
| 2024 (est.) | 27,919 | | −2.0% |
U.S. Decennial Census; 2020 Census

Aberdeen is the principal city of the Aberdeen Micropolitan Statistical Area, which includes all of Brown and Edmunds counties and has a population of 42,287 in the 2020 census and of 41,522 in the 2024 estimate.

According to realtor website Zillow, the average price of a home as of July 31, 2025, in Aberdeen is $238,567.

As of the 2023 American Community Survey, there are 12,341 estimated households in Aberdeen with an average of 2.20 persons per household. The city has a median household income of $63,715. Approximately 12.9% of the city's population lives at or below the poverty line. Aberdeen has an estimated 70.5% employment rate, with 33.6% of the population holding a bachelor's degree or higher and 93.1% holding a high school diploma.

The top five reported ancestries (people were allowed to report up to two ancestries, thus the figures will generally add to more than 100%) were English (92.8%), Spanish (3.0%), Indo-European (1.0%), Asian and Pacific Islander (2.6%), and Other (0.6%).

The median age in the city was 35.8 years.

=== Racial and ethnic composition ===
Aberdeen, South Dakota – racial and ethnic composition Note: the US Census treats Hispanic/Latino as an ethnic category. This table excludes Latinos from the racial categories and assigns them to a separate category. Hispanics/Latinos may be of any race.
| Race / ethnicity (NH = non-Hispanic) | Pop. 1980 | Pop. 1990 | Pop. 2000 | Pop. 2010 | Pop. 2020 |
|---|---|---|---|---|---|
| White alone (NH) | 24,970 (96.59%) | 23,867 (95.75%) | 23,209 (94.12%) | 23,759 (91.06%) | 23,482 (82.41%) |
| Black or African American alone (NH) | 35 (0.14%) | 39 (0.16%) | 89 (0.36%) | 171 (0.66%) | 522 (1.83%) |
| Native American or Alaska Native alone (NH) | 797 (3.08%) | 806 (3.23%) | 775 (3.14%) | 922 (3.53%) | 955 (3.35%) |
| Asian alone (NH) | 86 (0.33%) | 124 (0.50%) | 133 (0.54%) | 327 (1.25%) | 892 (3.13%) |
| Pacific Islander alone (NH) | — | — | 26 (0.11%) | 42 (0.16%) | 42 (0.15%) |
| Other race alone (NH) | 0 (0.00%) | 3 (0.01%) | 4 (0.02%) | 16 (0.06%) | 83 (0.29%) |
| Mixed race or multiracial (NH) | — | — | 226 (0.92%) | 442 (1.69%) | 1,054 (3.70%) |
| Hispanic or Latino (any race) | 68 (0.26%) | 88 (0.35%) | 196 (0.79%) | 412 (1.58%) | 1,465 (5.14%) |
| Total | 25,851 (100.00%) | 24,927 (100.00%) | 24,658 (100.00%) | 26,091 (100.00%) | 28,495 (100.00%) |

=== 2020 census ===
As of the 2020 census, there were 28,495 people, 12,226 households, and 6,767 families residing in the city.

The median age was 36.4 years. 23.3% of residents were under the age of 18 and 17.5% of residents were 65 years of age or older. For every 100 females there were 95.7 males, and for every 100 females age 18 and over there were 93.8 males age 18 and over.

98.0% of residents lived in urban areas, while 2.0% lived in rural areas.

There were 12,226 households in Aberdeen, of which 27.4% had children under the age of 18 living in them. Of all households, 39.9% were married-couple households, 22.7% were households with a male householder and no spouse or partner present, and 29.4% were households with a female householder and no spouse or partner present. About 37.4% of all households were made up of individuals and 14.5% had someone living alone who was 65 years of age or older.

There were 13,397 housing units, of which 8.7% were vacant. The homeowner vacancy rate was 2.1% and the rental vacancy rate was 10.9%.

Racial composition as of the 2020 census
| Race | Number | Percent |
|---|---|---|
| White | 23,825 | 83.6% |
| Black or African American | 553 | 1.9% |
| American Indian and Alaska Native | 1,045 | 3.7% |
| Asian | 896 | 3.1% |
| Native Hawaiian and Other Pacific Islander | 43 | 0.2% |
| Some other race | 626 | 2.2% |
| Two or more races | 1,507 | 5.3% |
| Hispanic or Latino (of any race) | 1,465 | 5.1% |

=== 2010 census ===
As of the 2010 census, there were 26,091 people, 11,418 households and 6,354 families residing in the city. The population density was 1,683.3 inhabitants per square mile (649.9/km^{2}). There were 12,158 housing units at an average density of 784.4 per square mile (302.9/km^{2}). The racial makeup of the city was 91.84% White, 0.68% African American, 3.62% Native American, 1.26% Asian, 0.16% Pacific Islander, 0.46% from some other races and 1.98% from two or more races. Hispanic or Latino people of any race were 1.58% of the population.

There were 11,418 households, of which 27.1% had children under the age of 18 living with them, 42.1% were married couples living together, 9.5% had a female householder with no husband present, 4.0% had a male householder with no wife present, and 44.4% were non-families. 36.9% of all households were made up of individuals, and 13.1% had someone living alone who was 65 years of age or older. The average household size was 2.18 and the average family size was 2.86.

The median age was 36.4 years. 22.2% of residents were under the age of 18; 12.8% were between the ages of 18 and 24; 24.1% were from 25 to 44; 24.4% were from 45 to 64; and 16.4% were 65 years of age or older. The gender make-up of the city was 47.6% male and 52.4% female.

=== 2000 census ===
As of the 2000 census, there were 24,658 people, 10,553 households and 6,184 families residing in the city. The population density was 1,902.1 inhabitants per square mile (734.4/km^{2}). There were 11,259 housing units at an average density of 868.5 per square mile (335.3/km^{2}). The racial makeup of the city was 94.61% White, 0.37% African American, 3.17% Native American, 0.54% Asian, 0.13% Pacific Islander, 0.19% from some other races and 0.99% from two or more races. Hispanic or Latino people of any race were 0.79% of the population. In terms of ancestry, 53.7% were of German, 15% Norwegian and 8.5% Irish.

There were 10,553 households, of which 27.3% had children under the age of 18 living with them, 47.0% were married couples living together, 8.9% had a female householder with no husband present, and 41.4% were non-families. 34.9% of all households were made up of individuals, and 13.6% had someone living alone who was 65 years of age or older. The average household size was 2.21 and the average family size was 2.86.

21.8% of the population were under the age of 18, 14.1% from 18 to 24, 26.4% from 25 to 44, 20.4% from 45 to 64, and 17.2% were 65 years of age or older. The median age was 36 years. For every 100 females, there were 89.2 males. For every 100 females age 18 and over, there were 85.3 males.

The median household income was $33,276 and the median family income was $43,882. Males had a median income of $30,355 and females $20,092. The per capita income was $17,923. About 7.6% of families and 10.5% of the population were below the poverty line, including 10.6% of those under age 18 and 10.1% of those age 65 or over.

=== Religion ===
There are several Roman Catholic, Baptist, Presbyterian, Methodist, Pentecostal, Lutheran, Church of Jesus Christ of Latter-day Saints, Nazarene, and Non-denominational churches in the area, as well as one synagogue.

== Economy ==
=== Major employers ===
| Business | Full-time Employees |
|---|---|
| Avera Saint Luke's Hospital | 1,500 |
| Aberdeen Public School District | 650 |
| Wells Fargo Auto Finance | 450 |
| 3M | 650 |
| Super 8 Worldwide | 400 |
| Hub City Inc. | 339 |
| Agtegra Cooperative | 600+ |
| Midstates Printing/Quality Quick Print | 300 |
| Northern State University | 298 |

Super 8 Motels was founded in 1972 by Dennis Brown and Ron Rivett as a motel referral system, which was replaced with a franchise operation in 1973. The first Super 8, with 60 rooms, was opened in 1974 in Aberdeen and still operates today as the Super 8 Aberdeen East.

== Arts and culture ==
The Aberdeen Area Arts Council publishes a small monthly newspaper, ARTiFACTS, with information on area events.

The Aberdeen Community Theatre was created in 1979 and performs at the Capitol Theatre in downtown Aberdeen. The Capitol Theatre opened in 1927 and donated to the Aberdeen Community Theatre in 1991; since then more than $963,000 has been spent on renovating and preserving the historical aspect of the Capitol Theatre. Today, the Aberdeen Community Theatre performs five mainstage productions and three youth productions per year.

The South Dakota Film Festival established in 2007 is held annually in the fall. The festival has been host to Kevin Costner, Graham Greene, Adam Greenberg, CSA and many more stars of film and television. The festival's first feature film screened was Into The Wild, shot partially in SD. The festival is held at the historic Capitol Theatre.

The Northern State University Theater Department puts on plays during the school year.

There are four galleries in Aberdeen: Presentation College's Wein Gallery, Northern State University's Lincoln Gallery, the Aberdeen Recreation & Cultural Center (ARCC) Gallery and the ArtWorks Cooperative Gallery located in The Aberdeen Mall.

== Sports ==
Bowling

The Village Bowl in Aberdeen is a modern bowling center with multiple lanes. Located at 1314 8th Ave NW.

Minor league baseball

Aberdeen has had three minor league baseball teams since 1920. The Aberdeen Boosters, a class D league team, played in 1920, the Aberdeen Grays, also a class D team, played from 1921 to 1923. The class C Aberdeen Pheasants from 1946 to 1971, and 1995 to 1997. The Pheasants were the affiliate of the former St. Louis Browns (and current Baltimore Orioles). Aberdeen was a stop to the majors for such notable players as Don Larsen (perfect game in the World Series), Lou Piniella (AL rookie of the year with Kansas City Royals in 1969), and Jim Palmer, Baseball Hall of Fame pitcher for the Baltimore Orioles. In the 1960s, the Pheasants were Coached by Cal Ripken Sr, who later ended up being a Major League Coach and had two sons Cal Jr. and Billy that also played for the Orioles organization.

On June 8, 2024, the first SABR Historical Marker in the state of South Dakota was revealed on the campus of Northern State University. It was the 60th anniversary to the day when the Baltimore Orioles played an exhibition game at the ballpark.

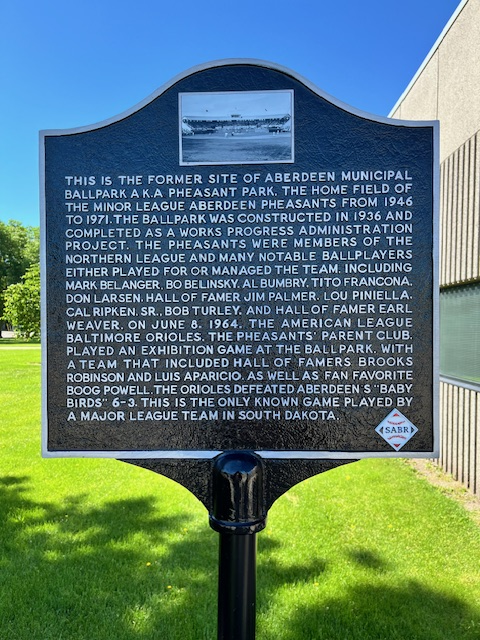
Aberdeen Pheasants SABR Historical Marker

Tennis

Aberdeen has 19 public tennis courts throughout the city – Melgaard Park (4), Northern State University (6), and Holgate Middle School (8).

Golf

Aberdeen has three golf courses: Lee Park Municipal Golf Course, Moccasin Creek Country Club and Rolling Hills Golf Club. Lee Park and Moccasin Creek are both 18-hole courses. Rolling Hills is a combined nine-hole course and housing development which opened in 2005.

Hockey/ice skating

Aberdeen has several outdoor skating rinks and hockey rinks open to the public during winter months. Aberdeen is also home to the NAHL team, Aberdeen Wings.

Skateboarding/rollerblading

Aberdeen has a skate park located between East Melgaard Road and 17th Ave SE at Melgaard Park. The equipment installed includes a quarter pipe, penalty box with half pyramid, bank ramp, spine, kinked rail and a ground rail.

Disc golf

Aberdeen has two disc golf courses, Melgaard Park, and the Richmond Lake Disc Golf Course.

Roller Derby

Aberdeen has an All-women's Roller Derby league "A-Town Roller Girlz" established in 2011, also bringing Junior Roller Derby to the area.

== Parks and recreation ==
Aberdeen Family YMCA
The full service YMCA includes an aquatic center with a competitive size lap pool, zero depth entry recreation pool with play features and hot tub. There are three gyms one of which has a climbing wall. There are two racquetball courts. Saunas and steam rooms are in the men's and women's locker rooms. Over 100 group fitness classes are offered each week with child watch available (short term childcare). A wellness center that has cardio equipment, weight machines and free weights.

Family Aquatic Center
Completed in the summer of 2007, this complex includes a zero entry pool, competition lap pool, lazy river, numerous water slides, play sand area, and a concession area.

Wylie Park Recreation Area
Wylie Park Recreation Area features go-kart racing, sand volleyball courts, access to Wylie Lake, camping area, picnic areas, and is connected to Storybook Land. Wylie Lake is a small man-made lake, open in the summer months for swimming, lying on the beach, and paddle boating. Additionally, Wylie Park is stocked with fish by Game, Fish, and Parks, allowing local residents the opportunity to hone new fishing skills.

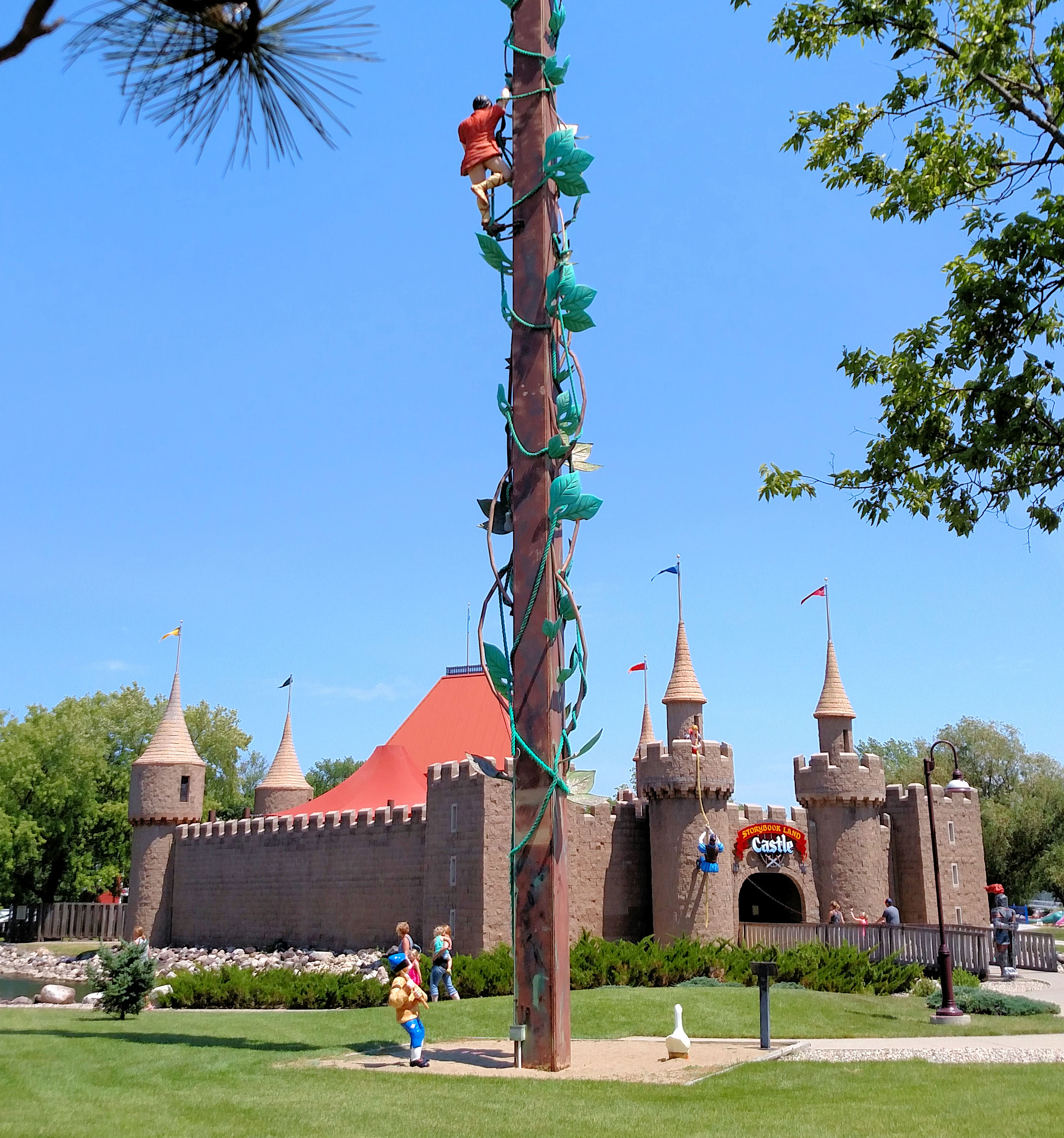
Storybook Land Castle with Jack and the Beanstalk in the foreground

Storybook Land
The park has attractions from several different children's storybooks, including a castle, as well as a train that takes visitors through the park. There are two barns which contain petting zoos. Humpty Dumpty's Great Fall Roller Coaster was added to the park, summer 2015. Newly added is the Land of Oz, that features characters and attractions from L. Frank Baum's The Wonderful Wizard of Oz. Baum was a resident of Aberdeen in the 1880s. He left after a severe drought led to the failure first of his variety store Baum's Bazaar, and then to his newspaper The Aberdeen Saturday Pioneer, where he wrote an opinion column titled Our Landlady.

Kuhnert Arboretum
The arboretum provides many new learning experiences for the residents of the Aberdeen area, including school-aged children. The Arboretum offers environmental education, a children's area, rose garden collection, recreational trails and much more.

Richmond Lake Recreation Area
The area is used by all types of outdoors enthusiasts. Three separate areas in this park cater to the needs of campers, swimmers, naturalists, boaters and anglers. Campers stay in the South Unit, while the 200-acre (0.8 km^{2}) Forest Drive Unit is a great place for wildlife viewing. The Boat Ramp Unit provides access to the more than 1,000-acre (4 km^{2}) lake. Richmond Lake Recreation Area's small campground offers a quiet camping experience. The park also features a wheelchair accessible camping cabin. The park's extensive trail system features over 10 miles (16 km) of trails, including both accessible and interpretive trails. Hikers, bikers, and horseback riders can observe the abundance of prairie plants and wildlife of the area up-close. The park has multiple private and public boat ramps as well as an accessible fishing dock. Richmond Lake has a population of walleye, northern pike, bass, perch, crappie, bluegill, catfish, and bullheads within its waters. An entrance fee is required to gain access to the water and park itself.

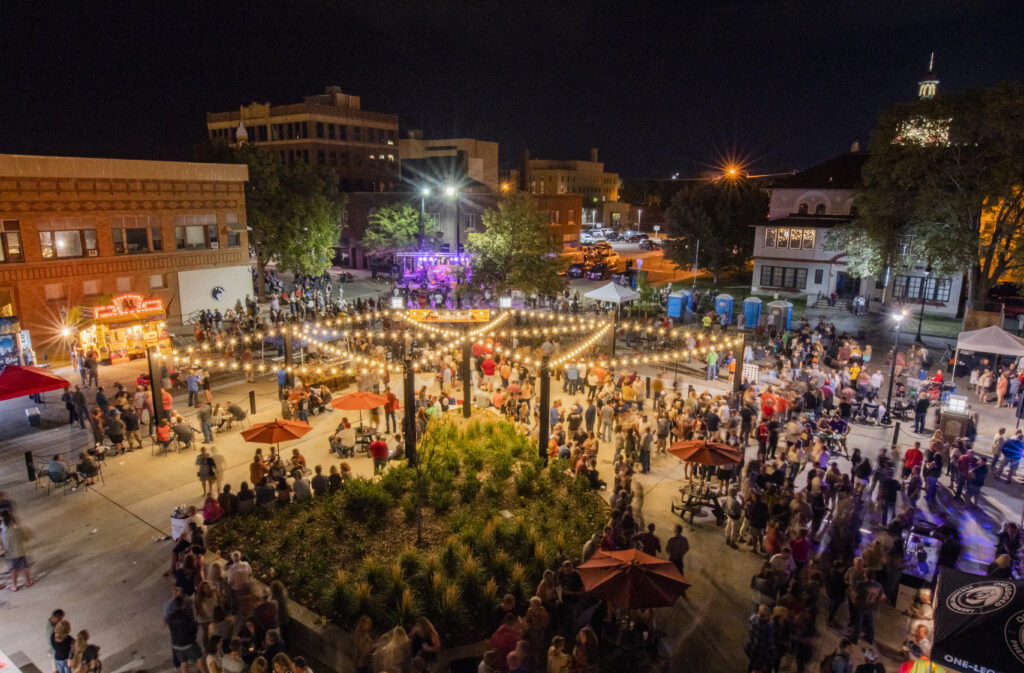
https://aberdeensd.com/the-right-move/

Malchow Plaza
The Malchow Plaza is a new, public community space & business hub in downtown Aberdeen. Built after a 2019 fire destroyed the historic Malchow's Home Furnishings building, it now serves as an outdoor gathering area, featuring the downtown farmer's market, summer concerts, and many other community activities.

== Government ==
Aberdeen is the center of government for Brown County. City government is overseen by a City Manager/Council form of government with a mayor and eight council members. The City Manager is David McNeil, and the City Council is composed of Mayor Travis Shaunaman and Council Members Char Liebelt, Rich Ward, Erin Fouberg, Rob Ronayne, Alan Johnson, Chad Nilson, David Novstup and Talmage Ekanger. Each council member serves a five-year term.

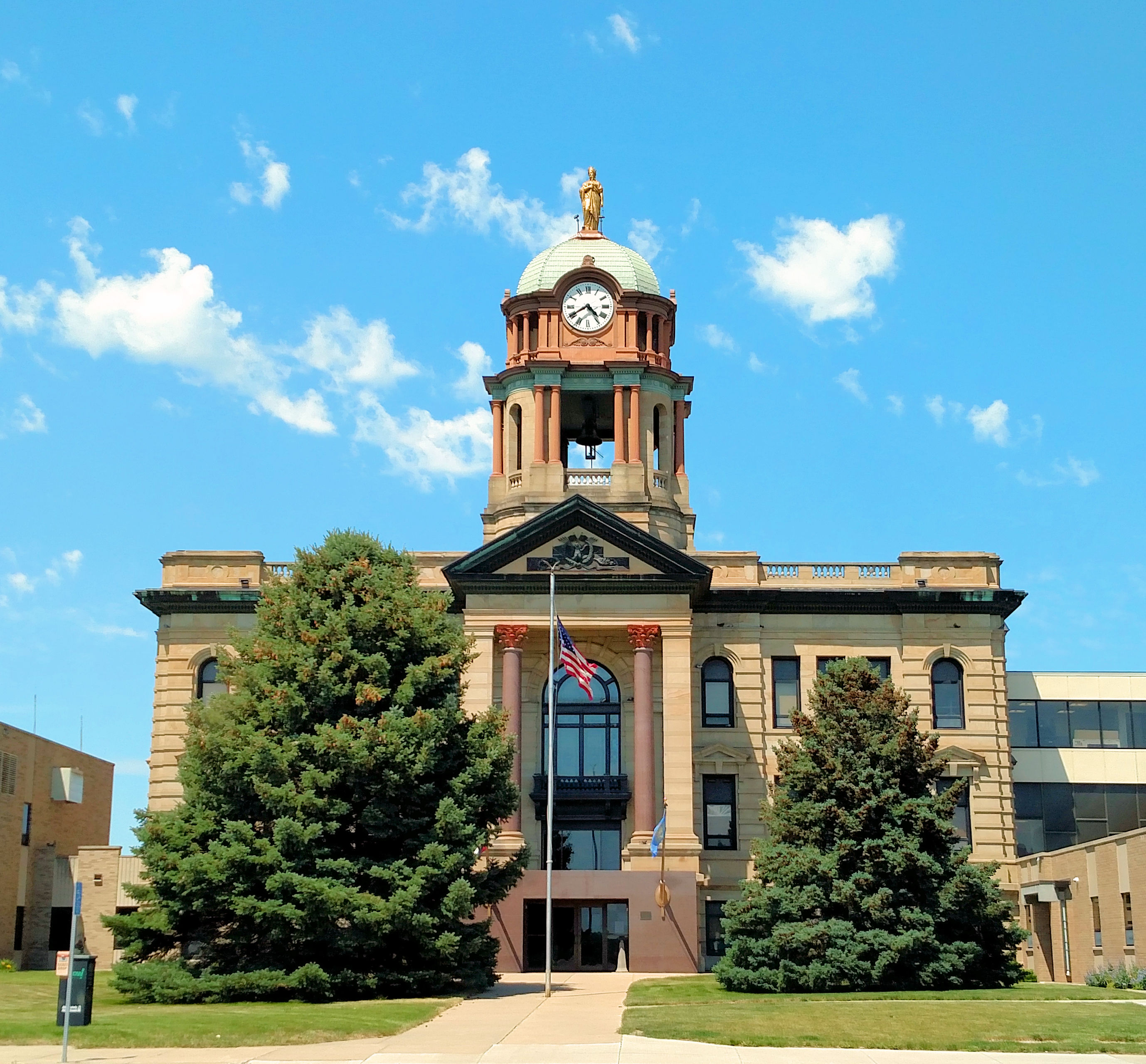
Brown County Courthouse

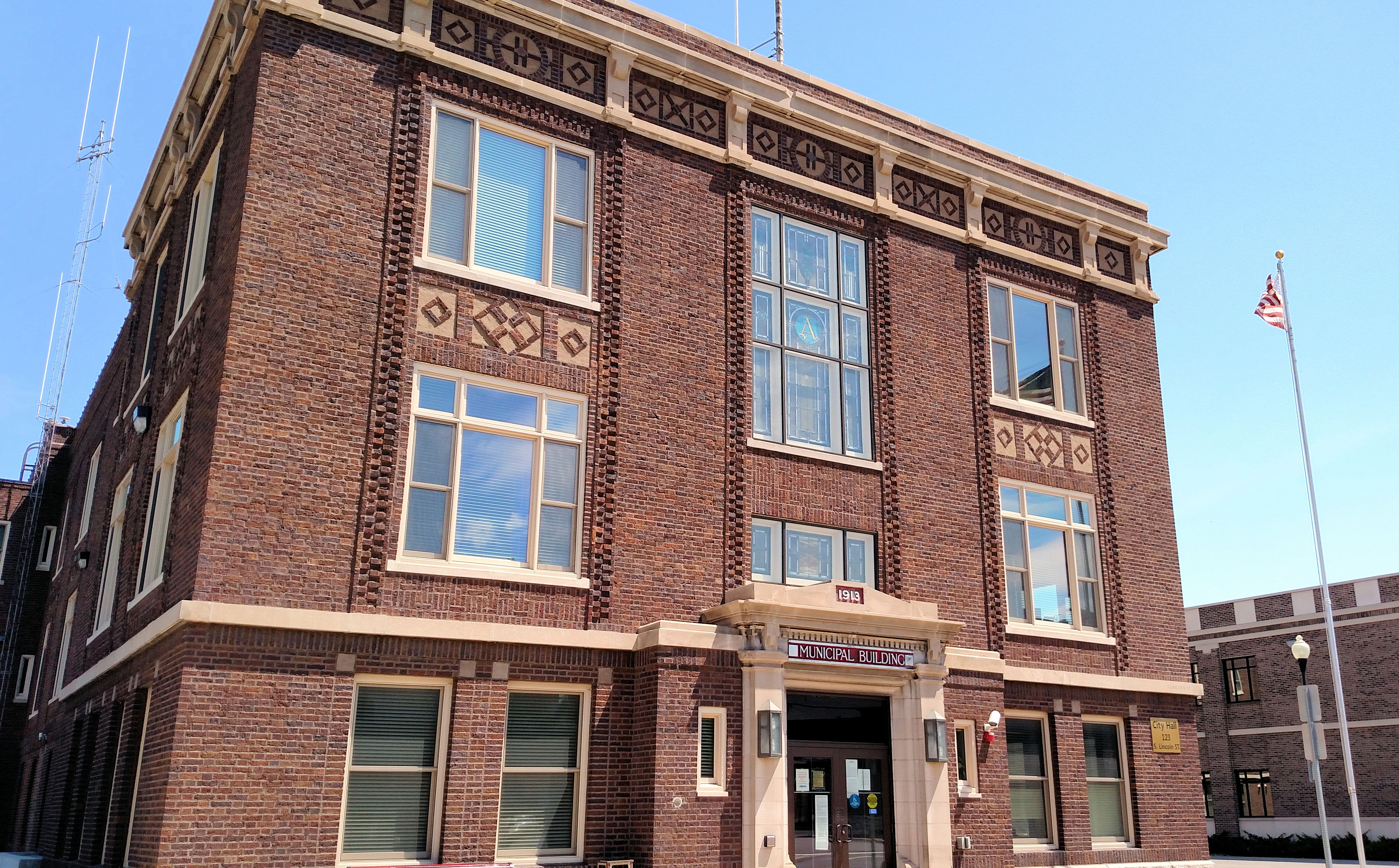
Aberdeen's Municipal Building

County government is overseen by five commissioners. Each county commissioner serves a five-year term. Aberdeen is home to Brown County offices including clerk-magistrate, county auditor, landfill office, register of deeds, county treasurer, coroner, emergency management, highway superintendent, public welfare, state's attorney, and a few others.

Looking at the local legislative map, Brown County spans all of District 3, along with parts of Districts 1 and 23. State Senators from Brown County include Katherine Washnok (D3) & Michael Rohl (D1). For District 3 State Representatives, we will see new leadership following the November 3, 2026 election as Tim Hanigan, Spencer Sommers, and Erin Ruder run for two open seats in Pierre.

In 2008, Governor Mike Rounds named Aberdeen as the South Dakota Community of the Year.

== Education ==
=== Public schools ===
Aberdeen Public Schools are part of the Aberdeen School District. The school district has six elementary schools, two middle schools, and one high school.

The elementary schools are C.C. Lee Elementary School, Lincoln Elementary School, May Overby Elementary School, O.M. Tiffany Elementary School, Simmons Elementary School and Mike Miller Elementary School. The two middle schools are Holgate Middle School, which serves the north side of Aberdeen, and Simmons Middle School, which serves the south side of the city. Students in the district attend Central High School. The Hub Area Technical School is located in the district. Aberdeen also has an alternative middle and high school.

The Aberdeen School District's enrollment for the year 2024–2025 was approximately 4,326 students, and the average class size was in the low to mid-twenties. Due to a projected increase in enrollment and the modernization of facilities, Simmons Middle School was completely remodeled with the demolition of the original 1929 building and the addition of a new classroom and cafeteria building which was completed in August 2008. The public school in Aberdeen is AA under the SDHSAA.

=== Parochial schools ===
Aberdeen has several parochial schools, including the Catholic-affiliated Roncalli High School, the nondenominational Aberdeen Christian School, and Trinity Lutheran School of the WELS.

=== Special programs ===
The South Dakota School for the Blind and Visually Impaired is a state special school under the direction of the South Dakota Board of Regents.

=== Higher education ===
==== Northern State University ====
Northern State University (NSU) is a public university that was founded in 1901 and today occupies a 72-acre (290,000 m^{2}) campus. 2,528 students, ranging from first-year to graduate students, attended NSU for the 2006–2007 school year. The student-to-teacher ratio is 19:1.

NSU was originally called the Institute of South Dakota before changing its name to Northern Normal and Industrial School in 1901. It changed its name again in 1939 when it became the Northern State Teachers College, and again in 1964, becoming Northern State College before finalizing as Northern State University in 1989.

NSU offers thirty-eight majors and forty-two minors as well as other degrees, and also has nine graduate degree areas for students wishing to further their education after achieving their first degree.

The mascot of NSU is the wolf named Thunder.

==== Presentation College ====
Presentation College was a Catholic college on a 100-acre (0.40 km^{2}) campus, and was founded in 1951. Enrollment in fall 2014 was reported to be 735. PC offers 26 programs between the main Aberdeen campus and the other campuses located throughout the state. Most of the degrees offered are in the health-care field. The student to teacher ratio is 12:1. Presentation's mascot is the Saint, giving it the nickname the Presentation College Saints. Presentation College announced that it would no longer take new enrollments, and closed the college at the end of the summer semester in 2023.

== Media ==
The American News, formerly The Aberdeen American News, was founded as a weekly newspaper in 1885, by C.W. Starling and Paul Ware. In 2020, The American News moved their printing operations to Sioux Falls.

In January 2023, the publication Aberdeen Insider was started. In June 2024, they were listed as the city council's official newspaper.

=== Television ===
| Channel (Digital) | Callsign | Network | Owner |
|---|---|---|---|
| 3.1 | K24DT-D (Translator of KELO) | CBS | Nexstar Media Group |
| 3.2 | K24DT-D (Translator of KELO) | MyNetworkTV | Nexstar Media Group |
| 7.1 | K39CZ-D (Translator of KTTW) | Fox | Independent Communications |
| 7.2 | K39CZ-D (Translator of KTTW) | This TV | |
| 7.3 | K39CZ-D (Translator of KTTW) | Cozi TV | |
| 13.1 | K33MI-D (Translator of KSFY) | ABC | |
| 13.2 | K33MI-D (Translator of KSFY) | CW | |
| 13.3 | K33MI-D (Translator of KSFY) | MeTV | |
| 46.1 | K33MI-D (Translator of KDLT) | NBC | |
| 46.2 | K33MI-D (Translator of KDLT) | Antenna TV | |
| 16.1 | KDSD | PBS | SDPB |
| 16.2 | KDSD | World | SDPB |
| 16.3 | KDSD | Create | SDPB |
| 16.4 | KDSD | Kids | SDPB |

=== AM radio ===
AM radio stations
| Frequency | Call sign | Name | Format | Owner | City |
|---|---|---|---|---|---|
| 930 AM | KSDN | 930 KSDN | News/Talk | Hub City Radio | Aberdeen |
| 1420 AM | KGIM | ESPN Radio 1420/107.1 | Sports | Hub City Radio | Aberdeen |

=== FM radio ===
FM radio stations
| Frequency | Call sign | Name | Format | Owner | Target city/market | City of license |
|---|---|---|---|---|---|---|
| 88.1 FM | KFCA | | Christian | American Christian Radio | Aberdeen | Aberdeen |
| 89.7 FM | K209FR | Christian | Christian rock | CSN International | Aberdeen | Aberdeen |
| 90.1 FM | KEEA | | Christian | American Family Radio | Aberdeen | Aberdeen |
| 90.9 FM | KDSD | South Dakota Public Broadcasting | Public radio | South Dakota Public Broadcasting | Aberdeen | Pierpont |
| 91.7 FM | K219CM | South Dakota Public Broadcasting | Public radio | South Dakota Public Broadcasting | Aberdeen | Aberdeen |
| 94.1 FM | KSDN | 94.1 The Rock | Active rock | Hub City Radio | Aberdeen | Aberdeen |
| 94.5 FM | K233BN | | Christian contemporary | Prairie Winds Broadcasting | Aberdeen | Aberdeen |
| 94.9 FM | KLRJ | K-Love | Christian | Educational Media Foundation | Aberdeen | Aberdeen |
| 97.7 FM | KNBZ | Sunny 97.7 | Adult contemporary | Hub City Radio | Aberdeen | Redfield |
| 98.5 FM | K253AB | Praise FM | Christian | Christian Heritage Broadcasting | Aberdeen | Aberdeen |
| 102.1 FM | K271CN | KSDN | News/Talk | Hub City Radio | Aberdeen | Aberdeen |
| 103.7 FM | KGIM-FM | Pheasant Country 103 | Country | Hub City Radio | Aberdeen | Redfield |
| 105.5 FM | KMOM | 105.5 Maverick FM | Country | Dakota Broadcasting | Aberdeen | Roscoe |
| 106.7 FM | KBFO | Point FM | Top 40 | Hub City Radio | Aberdeen | Aberdeen |
| 107.1 FM | K296FW | ESPN Radio 1420/107.1 | Sports | Hub City Radio | Aberdeen | Aberdeen |
| 107.7 FM | KABD | 107-7 The Shark | Adult hits | Dakota Broadcasting | Aberdeen | Ipswich |

== Infrastructure ==
=== Transportation ===
==== Air ====
The Aberdeen Regional Airport is currently served by Delta Connection. It offers flights to Minneapolis-St. Paul International Airport using the Bombardier CRJ550 aircraft.

==== Roadways ====
There are two major US highways that serve Aberdeen. One is US Highway 281, a north–south highway that runs continuously from the Canadian border to the Mexican border, the only three-digit U.S. highway to do so. This also makes it the longest three-digit U.S. highway. The second highway is US Highway 12 that runs east–west across northern South Dakota from the Minnesota border before curving northwest into the southwestern corner of North Dakota. The western terminus is in Aberdeen, Washington, and the eastern terminus is in downtown Detroit, Michigan. US Highway 12 is the major thoroughfare in Aberdeen, and is signed in the city of Aberdeen as 6th Avenue South. US Highway 281 was recently realigned onto a new bypass that was constructed around the western area of the city.

==== Intercity Bus ====
Jefferson Lines is a bus service from Aberdeen that connects to Sioux Falls, South Dakota, Fargo, North Dakota, and Minneapolis, Minnesota.

==== Public Transit ====
Ride Line Transportation Services provides demand response service to the Aberdeen area. Aberdeen is the largest city in South Dakota without fixed-route service.

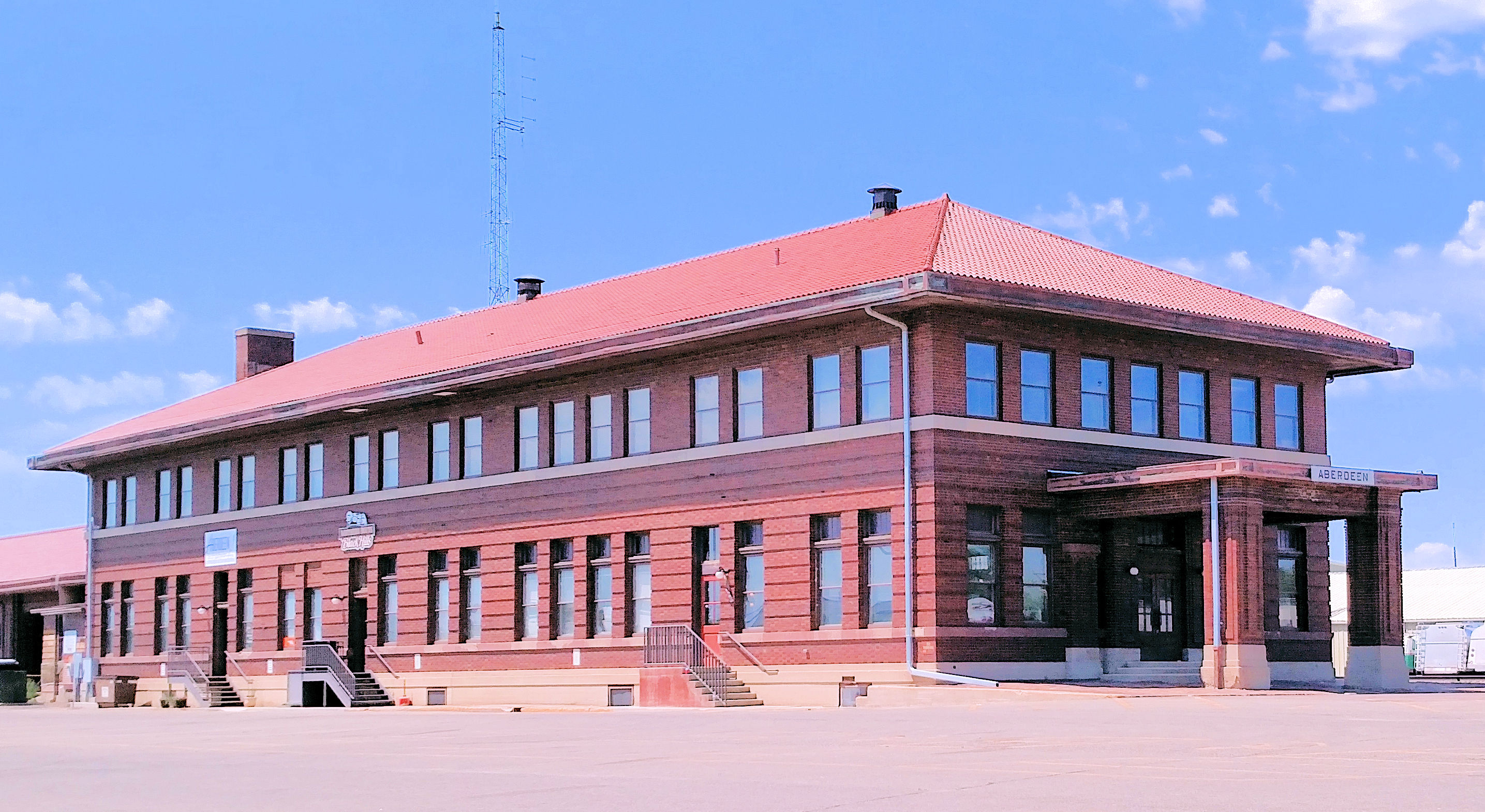
Historic Milwaukee Road depot in Aberdeen

==== Railroads ====
The BNSF Railway conveys freight and grain through Aberdeen. Until 1969 the Milwaukee Road ran trains between Aberdeen and Minneapolis. Earlier, until 1961, trains from Chicago to Seattle ran through the railroad's Aberdeen station. Burlington Northern purchased parts of the Milwaukee Road's "Pacific Extension" into Montana when the Milwaukee Road when bankrupt and ended service in 1977.

In addition, the Great Northern Railway was absorbed into the Burlington Northern in March 1970 with the merger of the Spokane, Portland, & Seattle Railway, the Chicago, Burlington, & Quincy Railroad, and the Northern Pacific Railway into one railroad company. The former Great Northern trackage was later purchased from Burlington Northern by Dakota, Missouri Valley & Western Railroad.

The Minneapolis & St. Louis Railway had a lightly used branch line from Donde South Dakota through Aberdeen, South Dakota to Long Lake, South Dakota and this line became Chicago & Northwestern Railway property when the Minneapolis & St. Louis Railway merged with the Chicago & Northwestern Railway October 1960. Chicago & Northwestern already had a lightly used branch line from James Valley Junction, South Dakota to Oakes, North Dakota. All the lines saw little traffic and were eventually abandoned by the Chicago and Northwestern before its 1995 merger with the Union Pacific Railroad.

=== Healthcare ===
Aberdeen has two hospitals, Avera St. Luke's Hospital and Sanford Aberdeen Medical Center.

There are several nursing homes in the area, including Avera Mother Joseph Manor, Manor Care, Bethesda Home of Aberdeen, Aberdeen Health and Rehab, Angelhaus and Gellhaus Carehaus.

== Notable people ==
- Michael Andrew, Olympic swimmer
- Bruce Baillie, experimental filmmaker, founding member of Canyon Cinema
- Sam Barry, Hall of Fame basketball, football and baseball coach
- L. Frank Baum, famous for his book The Wonderful Wizard of Oz
- Joshua Becker, minimalist writer
- Jerry Burke, organist for Lawrence Welk
- John Cacavas, Hollywood film score composer
- Emma Amelia Cranmer, temperance reformer, woman suffragist, writer
- Tom Daschle, former U.S. senator and Senate majority leader
- Justin Duchscherer, MLB pitcher for the Oakland Athletics
- Thomas Dunn, conductor who contributed to early music revival
- Sara K. Dye, M.D. (Sac and Fox/Shawnee), surgeon dedicating to reducing diabetes-related amputations
- Fischer quintuplets, the first surviving quintuplets in the United States were born in Aberdeen in 1963
- Terry Francona, baseball manager
- Matilda Joslyn Gage, suffragist, Native American activist and author
- Hamlin Garland, author of the Middle Border series
- Mary GrandPré, illustrator
- Frances Cranmer Greenman, artist
- Matt Guthmiller, once the youngest person to circumnavigate the globe by air
- Joseph Hansen, mystery writer
- Charles N. Herreid, Governor of South Dakota
- Josh Heupel, football player and coach
- Ron Holgate, singer and actor
- Buel Hutchinson, lawyer and politician
- Colton Iverson (born 1989), basketball player for Bàsquet Club Andorra
- David C. Jones, USAF general and former chairman of the Joint Chiefs of Staff
- Ronald Leighty, politician
- Roland Loomis, key figure in the modern primitive movement
- Kenneth J. Meier, political scientist, Texas A&M University
- Don Meyer, college basketball coach
- Saul Phillips, college basketball coach
- Ron Rivett, founder of Super 8 Motels and My Place hotels
- Paul Sather, college basketball coach
- Julie Sommars, actress
- Eddie Spears, actor
- Michael Spears, actor
