= Storybook Island =

Children's park in Rapid City, South Dakota

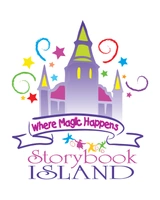
- Storybook Island logo

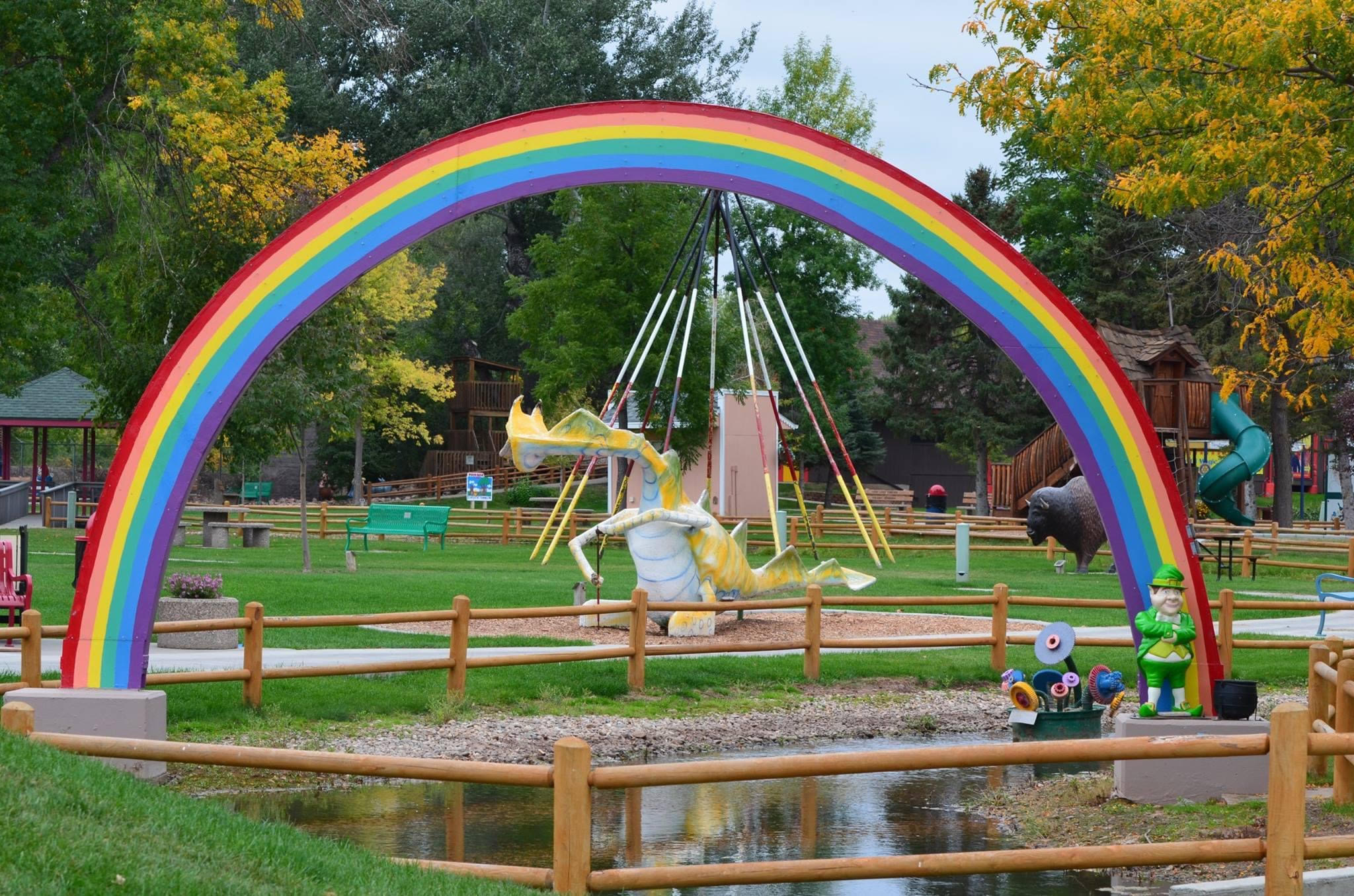
- Storybook Island Dragon and surrounding attractions
- Interactive map of Storybook Island
- Location: Rapid City, South Dakota, United States
- Coordinates: 44.072°N 103.2633°W.
- Opened: 1959
- Theme: Children's literature
- Operating season: May to September
- Website: Official website

Storybook Island is a children's amusement park in Rapid City, South Dakota with playgrounds and attractions based on locations and various characters found in children's books. The park was founded in 1959 by Merle Gunderson in association with the Rapid City Rotary Club. The park is free admission to the general public and relies on donations from its visitors and the community. The park is open Memorial weekend through Labor Day.

== Attractions ==
The park features large sculptures depicting characters and scenes from works including Yogi Bear, Humpty Dumpty, The Cat in the Hat, The Wonderful Wizard of Oz, Snow White and the Seven Dwarfs, Cinderella , and Winnie-the-Pooh.

The park also has several playgrounds and a theater that performs children's plays and other acts.

== History ==
The park was created on August 16, 1959, and was the product of donations from residents of Rapid City along with many local clubs and businesses at the time.The park has been open every year since its creation except for the year of the 1972 Black Hills flood, which caused extensive damage to the park and surrounding community.

Most of the play areas washed away in the flood, since the park is located near Rapid Creek (South Dakota) on the west side of Rapid city.

In recent years the park has made changes and improvements such as making wheelchair-accessible playsets and adding braille signs.

== See also ==
- Dinosaur Park
- The Journey Museum and Learning Center
