= Rapid City Public Library =

Public library system in South Dakota

Coordinates: 44°04.700′N 103°13.752′W

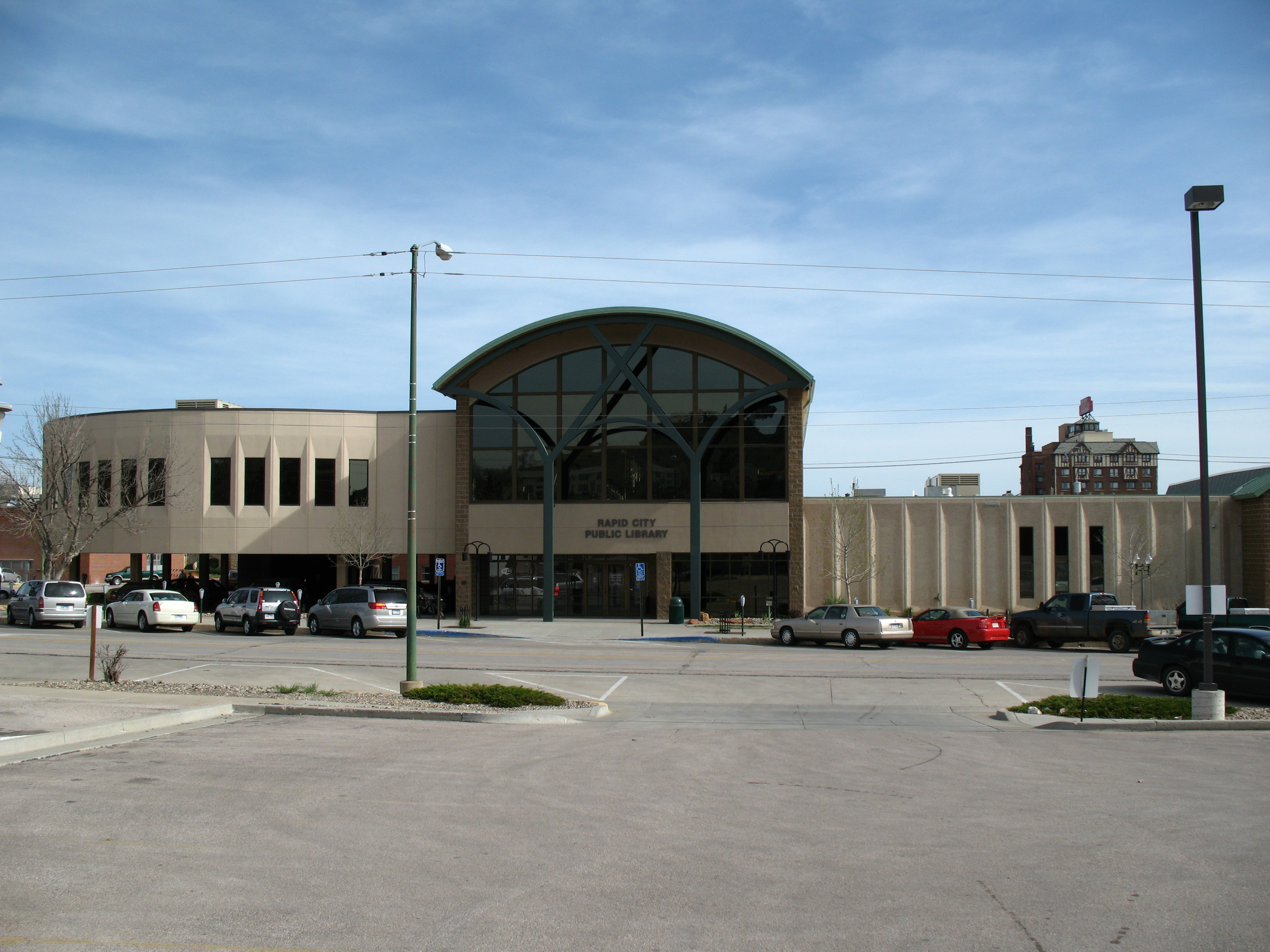
Rapid City Public Library, main branch

The Rapid City Public Library is the system of public libraries in Rapid City, South Dakota, United States. It is located at 610 Quincy Street. The library offers services at no charge for residents of Pennington County.

== History ==
Library services were first offered in Rapid City beginning in 1879, when a volunteer reading room was organized by community women with $45, donated books and periodicals, and a free subscription to the Minneapolis Journal. In an 1881 charter by the territorial government, the Rapid City Library Association built Library Hall on the corner of 6th and Kansas City Streets on donated land. In 1915, the city began building a Carnegie library building located on the corner of Kansas City and 6th streets in downtown Rapid City, and in 1917 the library collection moved there. The collection eventually outgrew the space, and in 1972 a new building was opened at 610 Quincy Street.

In 2002, the library added an expansion to house the juvenile and young adult collections, as well as to provide a service lobby, drive-through window and covered parking space.

In 2008, the Rapid City Public Library opened its first satellite location at 10 Van Buren Street as part of the new General Beadle School Community Center, housing a public elementary school and community hall. In 2020, this location closed as part of a mutual agreement between Rapid City Area Schools and Rapid City Public Library.

== Main location ==
The Rapid City main library is a 47,000-square-foot (4,400 m^{2}), two-story tall building in Rapid City's downtown area. The library has a collection of over 147,000 materials as well as thousands of digital resources, subscriptions to over 40 newspapers and magazines, and 53 public-use computers. Both locations offer free Wi-Fi access.

In 2008, the main library was named by Nancy Pearl in USA Today as one of "10 Great Places to Find a Nook and Read a Book".

The Historical Collections Room contains resources and archives related to Rapid City and the Black Hills area. Included in this collection are oral histories, television broadcasts and photographs of the 1972 Black Hills Flood, rare books focusing on Black Hills history, scrapbooks related to Rapid City mayors and city issues, and miscellaneous collections on a wide spectrum of local history subjects.

Local history resources also include online digital collections, such as the Black Hills Knowledge Network of local information; the Rapid City Oral History Project; and thousands of images and documents related to Rapid City and the Black Hills.

The Library offers a unique Dial-A-Story services that provides 24/7 access to recorded content. Patrons can call 605-574-7477 from any phone and use the menu to navigate to various recordings.

The library also has a "Makerspace", a location that offers services such as 3D printing, laser engraving, and vinyl printing.
