= The Journey Museum and Learning Center =

The Journey Museum
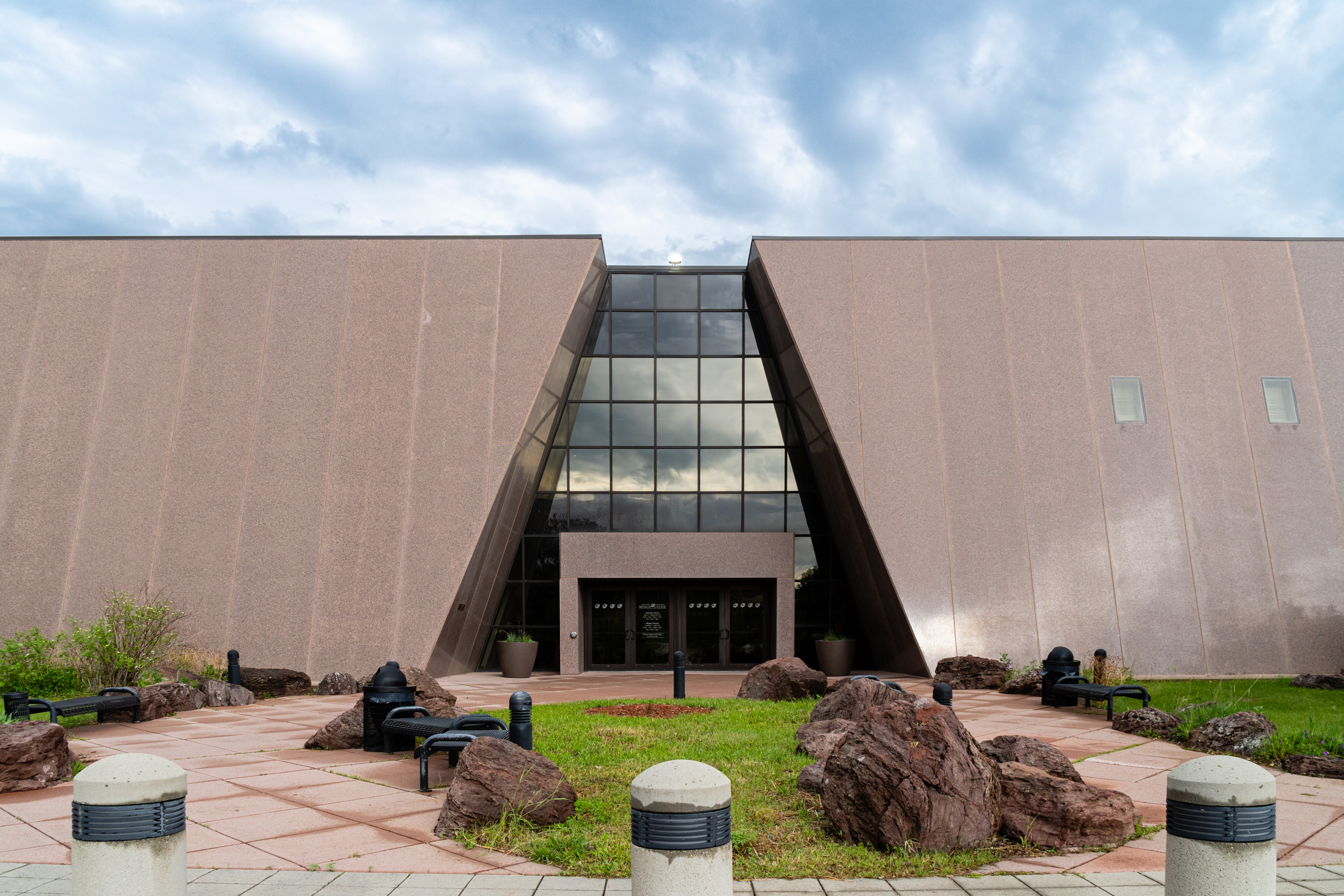
- The Journey Museum

- Location in South Dakota The Journey Museum and Learning Center (the United States)
- Established: May 18, 1997
- Location: Rapid City, South Dakota
- Coordinates: 44.086552°N 103.218591°W
- Type: Historical
- Visitors: Estimated 75,000-80,000 in 2008
- Director: Conor McMahon
- Public transit access: City View Trolley stops at door of museum, Rapid Ride's Lincoln Bus Route stops at corner of block.
- Website: www.journeymuseum.org

The Journey Museum and Learning Center is a museum in Rapid City, South Dakota, United States with 7 acres (28,000 m^{2}) of gardens. It is set up as a journey through the history of the Black Hills, starting with the Native American creation stories, moving into the 2.5 billion years of history in the rock record with the geology exhibit, paleontology, archaeology, Native American inhabitants, and concluding with the pioneers that traveled west.

== Main exhibit galleries ==
=== Geology and paleontology ===
The Geology Gallery contains a wall that shows a 2.5 billion year rock record of the Black Hills area. The Museum of Geology at the South Dakota School of Mines and Technology provides artifacts and information for patrons to better understand the timeline. Along with the geology section is the paleontology section with fossils, much of which is on loan from the Black Hills Institute of Geological Research in Hill City, South Dakota. A model of an on-site dig with a tent provides patrons with a sense of field work. A model of a T-Rex and a Triceratops accompanied by a roaring sound track are also included in the exhibit.

=== Archaeology ===
After the Geology and Paleontology exhibits is the Archaeology Gallery. This gallery is split into five sections, according to time period. It is divided into five sections listed in the chart below. The Archaeology Gallery contains artifacts and information from The South Dakota Archaeological Research Center.

Dates	Section
7500 BC	Paleo-Indians
7500-1500	Plains Archaic
1500-900	Plains Woodland
900-250	Plains Village
250-50 BC	"Historic"

=== Sioux Indian Museum ===
The Sioux Indian Museum, the next gallery after Archaeology, contains 5,500 pieces regulated by the United States Department of the Interior's Indian Arts and Crafts Board. Most of the collection is from the collection of a Native American arts collector who owned a trading post on the Rosebud Indian Reservation. This part of the collection was collected from the 1890s to the 1930s. The Sioux Indian Museum contains beaded items, ceremonial items, traditional Native American clothing, an exhibit of items made from animals, kids items (such as dolls and games), instruments, Native American saddles, and tipis. There is also a holographic Native American elder who tells three stories.

=== Pioneer ===
The Minnilusa Pioneer Gallery is the final gallery in the timeline layout of the museum. This collection has a trapper's cabin, a board walk, saddles that you can try out, a hardware store modeled after the first major hardware store in South Dakota, and several story boards with information and artifacts about the pioneer days. It features famous local legends such as Jim Bridger, General Custer, Wild Bill Hickok, Sitting Bull, Crazy Horse, and Red Cloud. It also covers the interaction between Native Americans and early settlers during the period from the first encounters to the modern day reconciliation with story walls that patrons of the museum can wind their way through.

=== Other permanent exhibits ===
The Journey Museum has several side exhibits either inside or between the main galleries.

- Star Room: A self-guided tour begins with the "Star Room" which represents the time between the forming of the universe and the forming of the rock record in the Black Hills. The voice-over gives both the scientific and Native American beliefs of how the universe was formed.
- Paleontology Field Tent: In this interactive exhibit, you can dig for dinosaur bones, do puzzles, and touch real fossils. The tent also features a real fossil preparation lab where patrons can get an up-close look at the different tools used by paleontologists in the field.
- Custer's Black Hills Expedition of 1874: This exhibit is located between the Sioux Indian Museum Gallery and the Pioneer Gallery. Photos and artifacts from the expedition such as a gun, eating utensils, a stirrup, a canteen and stopper, and a knife. This exhibit also features information and artifacts about the expedition's geologist, Newton Winchell, including his journal from the expedition.
- Aviary Room: The aviary room is located off the Hardware Store in the Pioneer gallery. It contains just over 9 dozen stuffed birds and animals from the Black Hills area. These were collected by Henry Behren from 1888 to 1911 within 25 miles (40 km) of Rapid City.
- Flood exhibit: The Flood Exhibit is located at the end of the Pioneer Gallery, just past the storywalls. It tells the story of the 1972 Black Hills flood, which occurred in the late hours of June 9, 1972. The flood, also known as the Rapid City Flood, was a key event in the history of Rapid City and the Black Hills, as it destroyed a large part of Rapid City and either killed, injured, or left homeless thousands of Rapid City residents. Created as a memorial for this event, this exhibit contains maps, pictures, survivor testimonies, news articles, a timeline, and information about recovery operations for the flood on a touch screen display. It discusses the future of Rapid City with the new "green spaces" that were formed after the flood waters receded. It also has a short film that loops regularly that visitors can watch while sitting on an era-appropriate bench in the center of the exhibit.
- Black Hills Forests Then and Now: This exhibit is located at the end of the Pioneer gallery, right next to the flood exhibit. This exhibit covers the changes that have happened in the forests in the Black Hills over the past 11,000 years. It also talks about how we have used it as a natural resource during the past 500 years when humans occupied the area. References to common Black Hills wildlife, including the American Bison, can be found here.

=== Activity tables ===
There are regular activity tables in every gallery that children and adults can enjoy. These have coloring pages, books, and activities relating to the gallery it is in.

== Grounds and gardens ==
The museum is surrounded by several acres of western native gardens maintained by a variety volunteer gardeners from the area. The gardens are created with the intent to feature indigenous plant life from the local Black Hills area and other plants found natively in the Western Hemisphere. The large garden area is split up into several small gardens wrapping around the museum. Various gardens contain vegetables, flowers, and trees.

== Events ==
The Journey Museum holds several regularly scheduled events. Additionally, they also have many special events that they book through the year, like a sculpting class for children or a presentation on how to make gingerbread houses.

== Education ==
As part of the mission, several education programs operate through the museum. Weekly educational programs include Toddler Tuesdays, Discovery Expedition, and Journey Into Space. The Journey Museum and Learning Center also offers customized learning experiences for school groups and tours. Educational outreach is also available with the museum's inflatable planetarium program.

=== Children's Learning Lab ===
Located in the Archaeology area of the museum, the Children's Learning Lab opened on July 1, 2008. It is a center for classes and various drop-by activities throughout the week. The drop-by activities available include books, puzzles, games, puppets, microscopes, and discovery boxes. Discovery boxes are small boxes with activities, information, and objects relating to a certain activity. You can check these boxes out and take them with you into the rest of the museum.

See also

- Black Hills Institute of Geological Research, Inc.
- List of museums in South Dakota

== Recognition ==
In 2021, the museum was awarded the CORES (Communication and OutReach Experiences in Science) award by the Sanford Underground Research Facility for outreach activities to promote science.
