= Uptown Rapid =

Shopping mall in Rapid City, South Dakota

Rushmore Mall

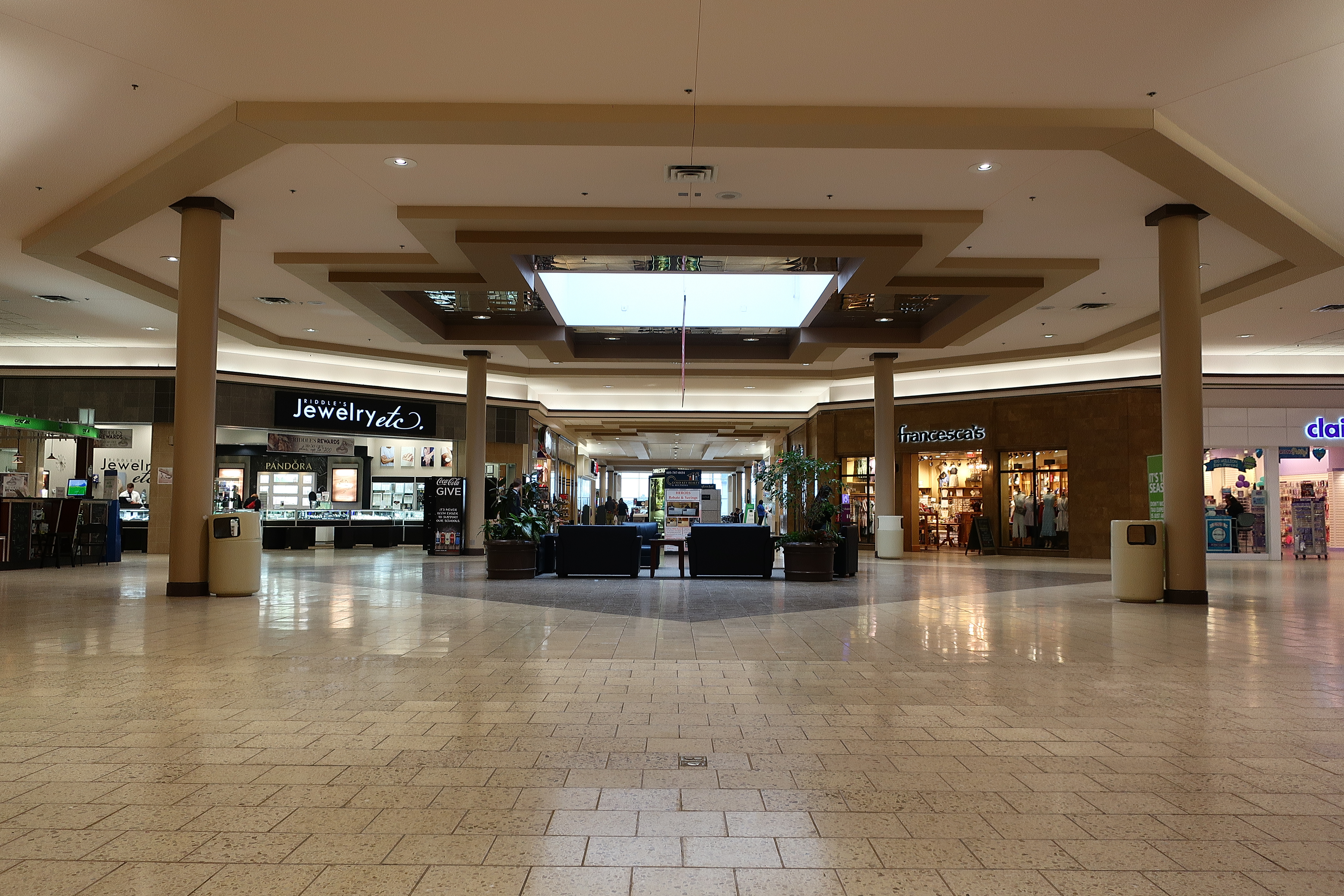
- Center near main entrance, 2019
- Location: Rapid City, South Dakota
- Opened: 1978
- Developer: General Growth Properties
- Owner: Rockstep Capital
- Num. of stores: 112
- Num. of anchor tenants: 5 (4 open, 1 vacant)
- Floor area: 831,040 square feet (77,206 m^{2})
- Floors: 1
- Public transit: Rapid City Rapid Ride
- Website: uptownrapid.com

Uptown Rapid, formerly Rushmore Mall, is a shopping mall located in Rapid City, South Dakota. It opened in 1978 and fulfills the needs of residents in a sprawling western South Dakota/northwestern Nebraska/northeastern Wyoming market area. The mall is currently owned by Rockstep Capital. The anchor stores are JCPenney, Planet Fitness, Traders Market, and At Home.

== History ==
Original anchors were JCPenney and Sears, each of which relocated from downtown Rapid City, and Herberger's, which originally was located on the south side of the mall. Target was added as a fourth anchor on the north side of the mall in 1980, while Herberger's erected a new location west of Target in 1995 and Scheels All Sports replaced the original Herberger's location. At Home is located where Target had existed before relocating to Rushmore Crossing strip mall. JCPenney temporarily moved into the vacated Target space in 2014 through 2016 while its existing store was renovated.

In 1999, Borders opened southwest of the mall. It closed in 2011 and later became Books-A-Million.

In 2009, Scheels all sports closed their location in the former Herberger’s space, it would remain vacant for a while. In 2012, the mall was taken to a servicer, due in part to JCPenney threatening mall owners to leave unless they were allowed to relocate to a larger store. In 2017, Planet Fitness would open in the empty Scheels space at the front of the mall.

On January 4, 2018, Sears announced that they would be closing as part of a plan to close 103 stores nationwide. The store closed in April 2018.

On April 18, 2018, Herberger's announced that they would also be closing in August 2018 as parent company The Bon-Ton was going out of business which left At Home and JCPenney as the only remaining retail anchors.

The mall was sold to Spinoso in 2018. The former Sears became Traders Market in 2019. In 2021, Rockstep Capital bought the mall and renamed it to Uptown Rapid.

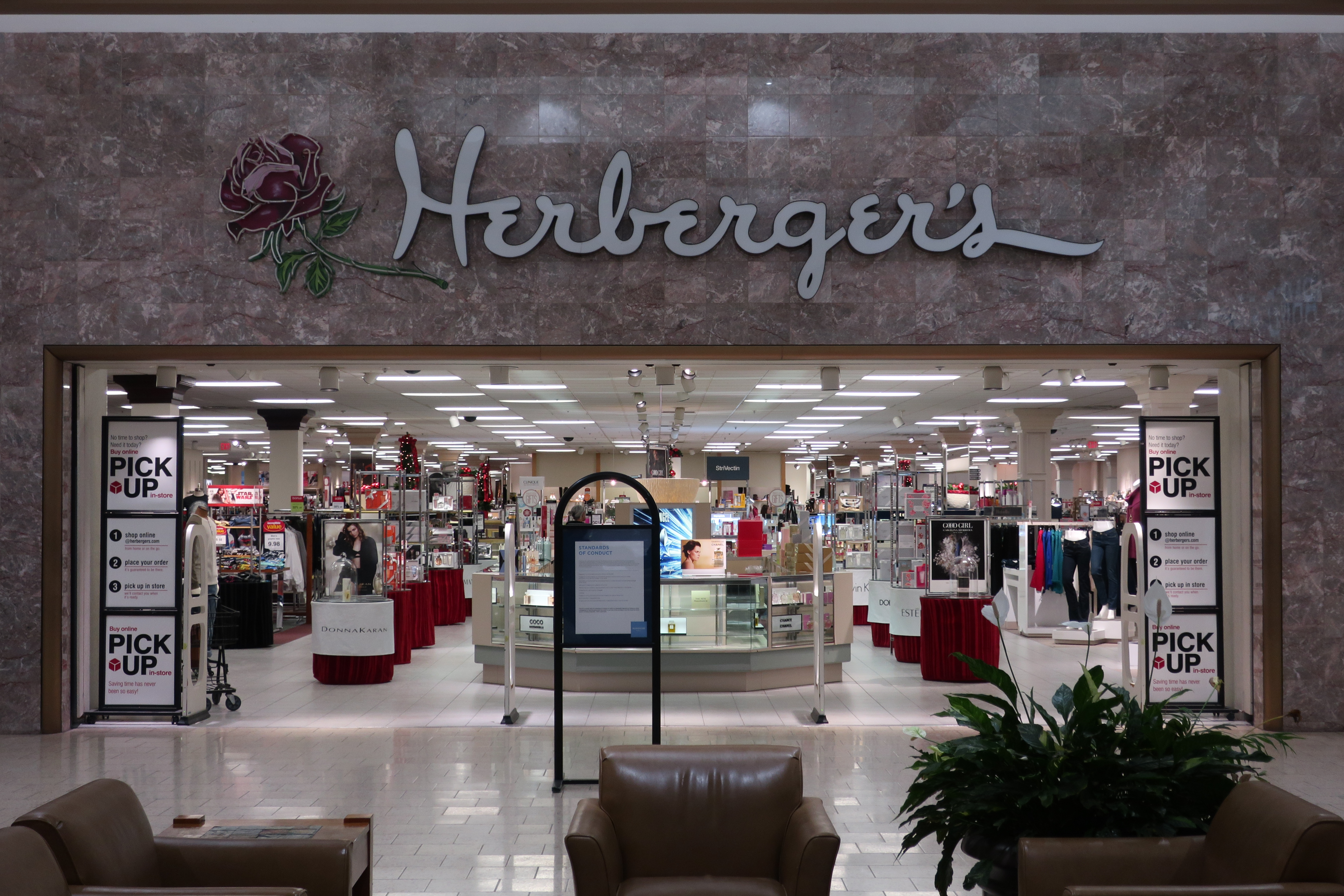
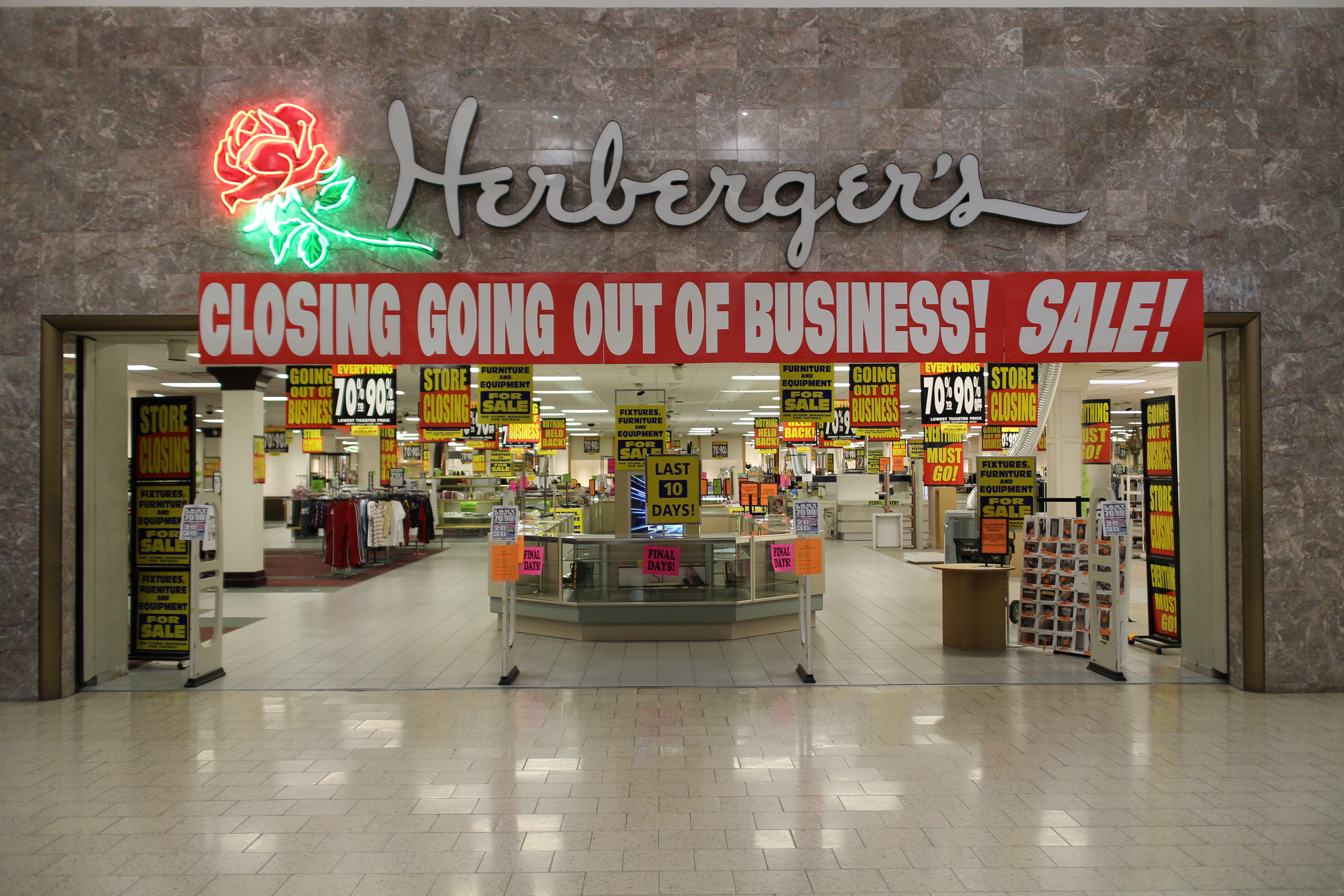
Former anchor Herberger's and its going out of business sale a few months later.
