= Jacob Kunstle =

German-American politician (1902–1985)

Member of the South Dakota Senate
- In office 1972–1972
- Preceded by: Eldon L. Smith

Personal details
- Born: January 12, 1902 Pfrondorf, Germany
- Died: February 27, 1985 (aged 83)
- Party: Democratic

Jacob Kunstle (January 12, 1902 – February 27, 1985) was a German-American politician. He served as a Democratic member of the South Dakota Senate.

== Life and career ==
Kunstle was born in Pfrondorf, Germany. He was a Gettysburg businessman.

Kunstle served in the South Dakota Senate in 1972.

Kunstle died on February 27, 1985, at the age of 83.
