= KIMM (AM) =

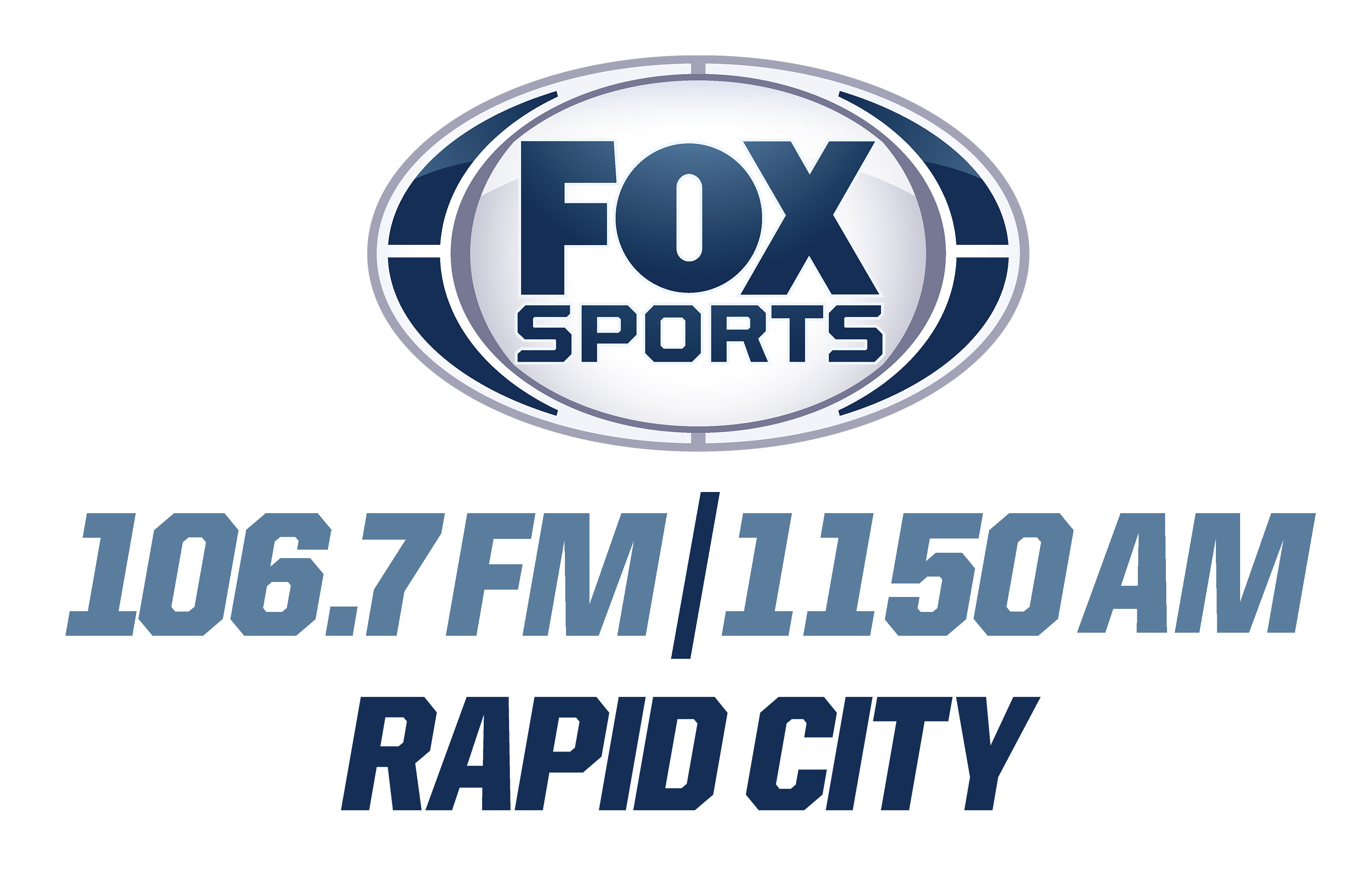
- Rapid City, South Dakota; United States
- Broadcast area: Rapid City metropolitan area
- Frequency: 1150 kHz
- Branding: FOX Sports Rapid City, The Black Hills Sports Station

Programming
- Format: Sports radio
- Affiliations: FOX Sports Radio

Ownership
- Owner: Nate Brown Sale pending to Riverfront Broadcasting; (Black Hills Broadcasting, L.L.C.)

History
- First air date: March 16, 1962

Technical information
- Licensing authority: FCC
- Facility ID: 66820
- Class: B
- Power: 5,000 watts (day); 36 watts (night)
- Transmitter coordinates: 44°4′34″N 103°8′49″W
- Translator: 106.7 K294BT (Rapid City)

Links
- Public license information: Public file; LMS
- Website: foxsportsrapidcity.com

KIMM (1150 AM, "FOX Sports Rapid City") is an American radio station that broadcasts a sports radio format featuring programming from Fox Sports Radio. Licensed to Rapid City, South Dakota, the station primarily serves the Rapid City metropolitan area. KIMM is owned by Black Hills Broadcasting, L.L.C. It also broadcasts on FM translator K294BT 106.7 MHz.

On October 30, 2017, following an agreement for the sale of the station, KIMM changed their format from news/political talk to sports talk and rebranded as "FOX Sports Rapid City".

== History ==
KIMM first signed on the air on March 16, 1962. In its early years, KIMM served as the region's primary Top 40/Rock and Roll station. During this era, it was a vital platform for local youth culture and a training ground for disc jockeys who later moved to larger national markets. The station's influence was recognized by its induction into the South Dakota Rock and Roll Hall of Fame. In the late 1990s, the station was owned by James and Thomas Ingstad, prominent radio owners in the Upper Midwest. In May 1999, KIMM was sold to Triad Broadcasting as part of a $37.8 million multi-station deal. By the mid-2000s, ownership shifted to Schurz Communications, which integrated KIMM into a cluster that included other heritage Rapid City stations like KOTA (AM).

In October 2017, the station was sold to Black Hills Broadcasting, L.L.C., owned by Nate Brown, which precipitated the move to the current sports-talk format. For many years, it was the Rapid City home for The Dave Ramsey Show and other nationally syndicated conservative talk programs.

In August 2026, the station was transferred to Riverfront Broadcasting, joining sister stations KOTA and KDSJ, and four other FM stations. The sale was not finalized with the FCC by August 4th but was in progress.

previous logo
