= Rapid City, South Dakota =

Rapid City, South Dakota Mnilúzahaŋ Otȟúŋwahe (Lakota)
- City
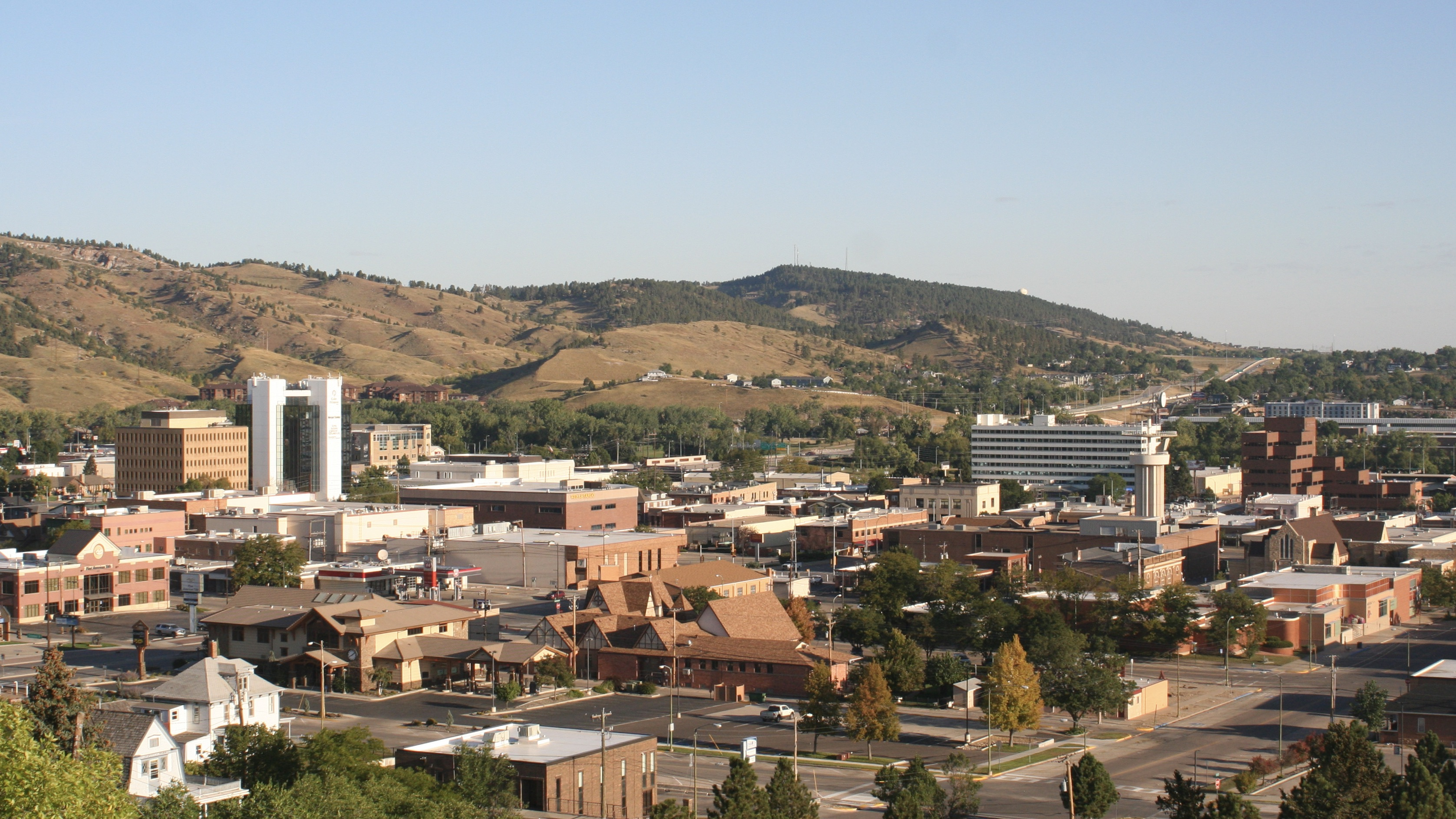
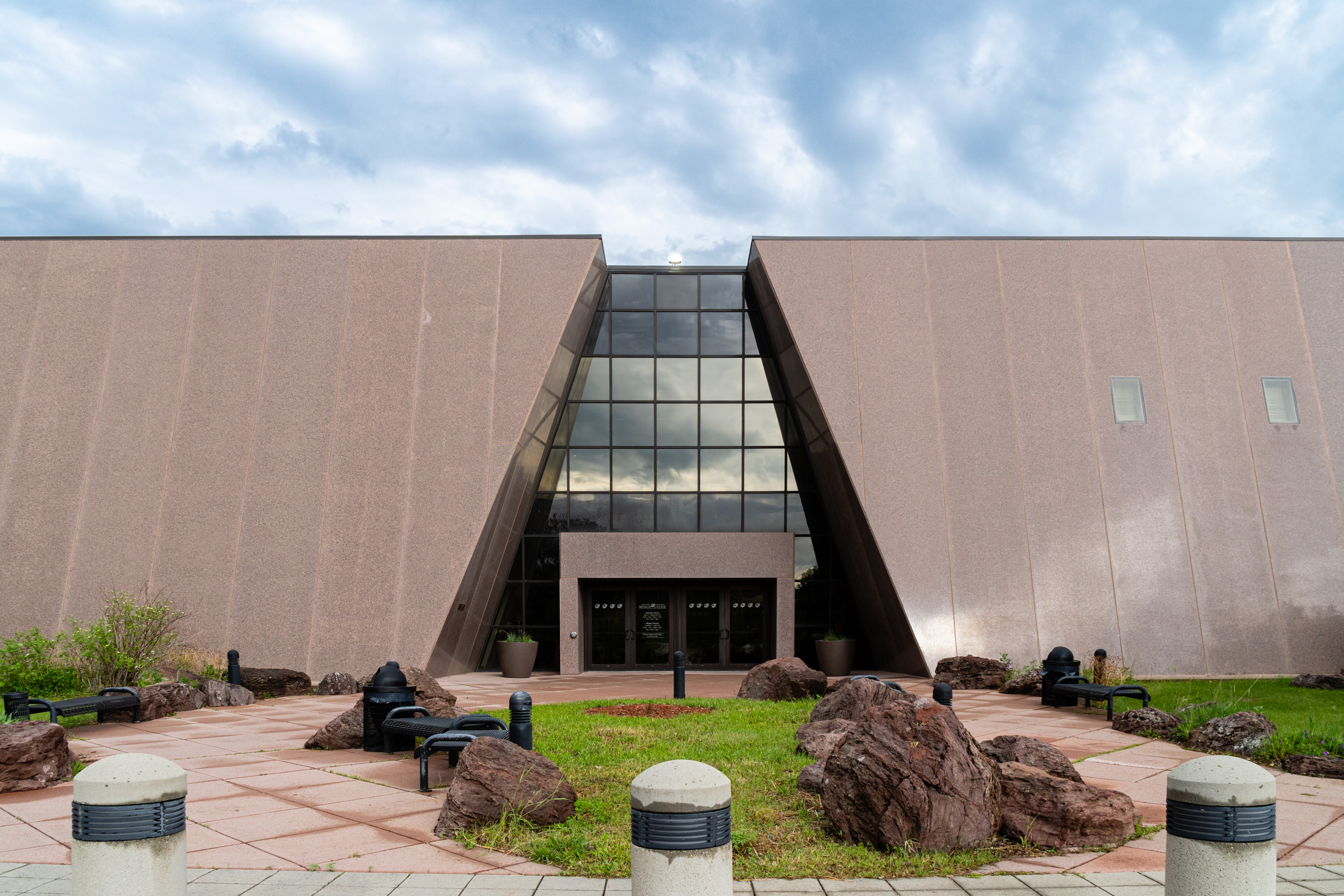
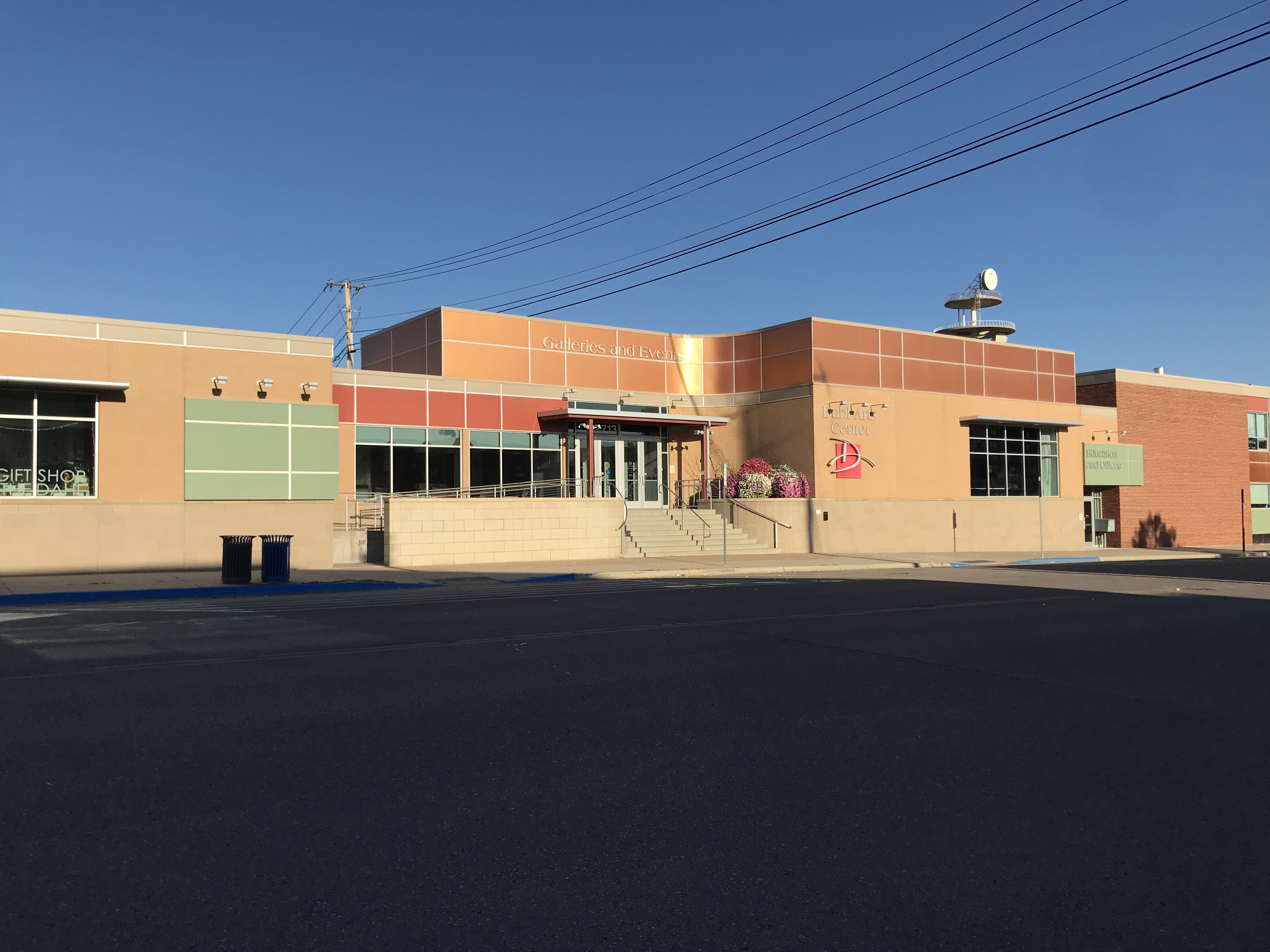
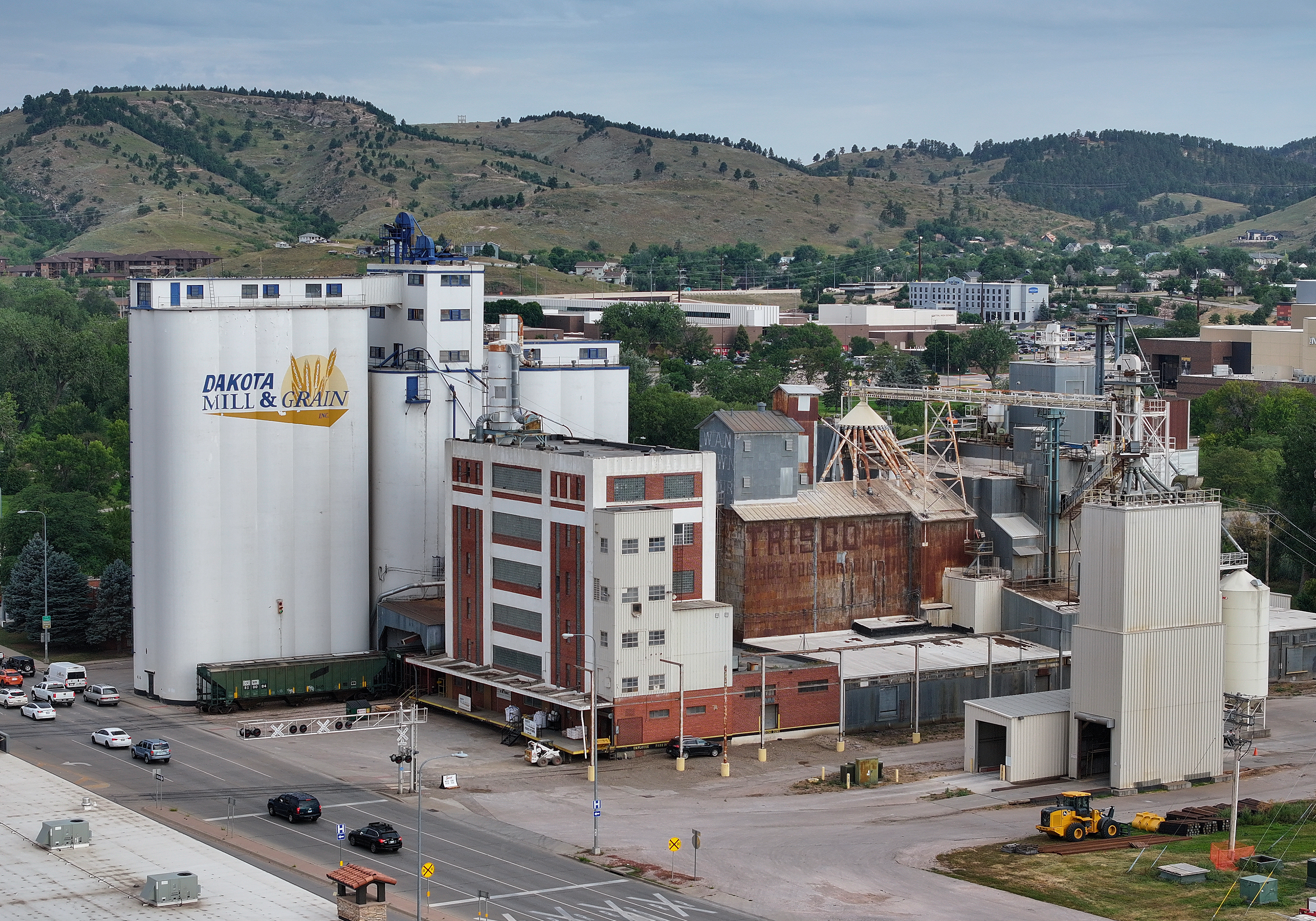
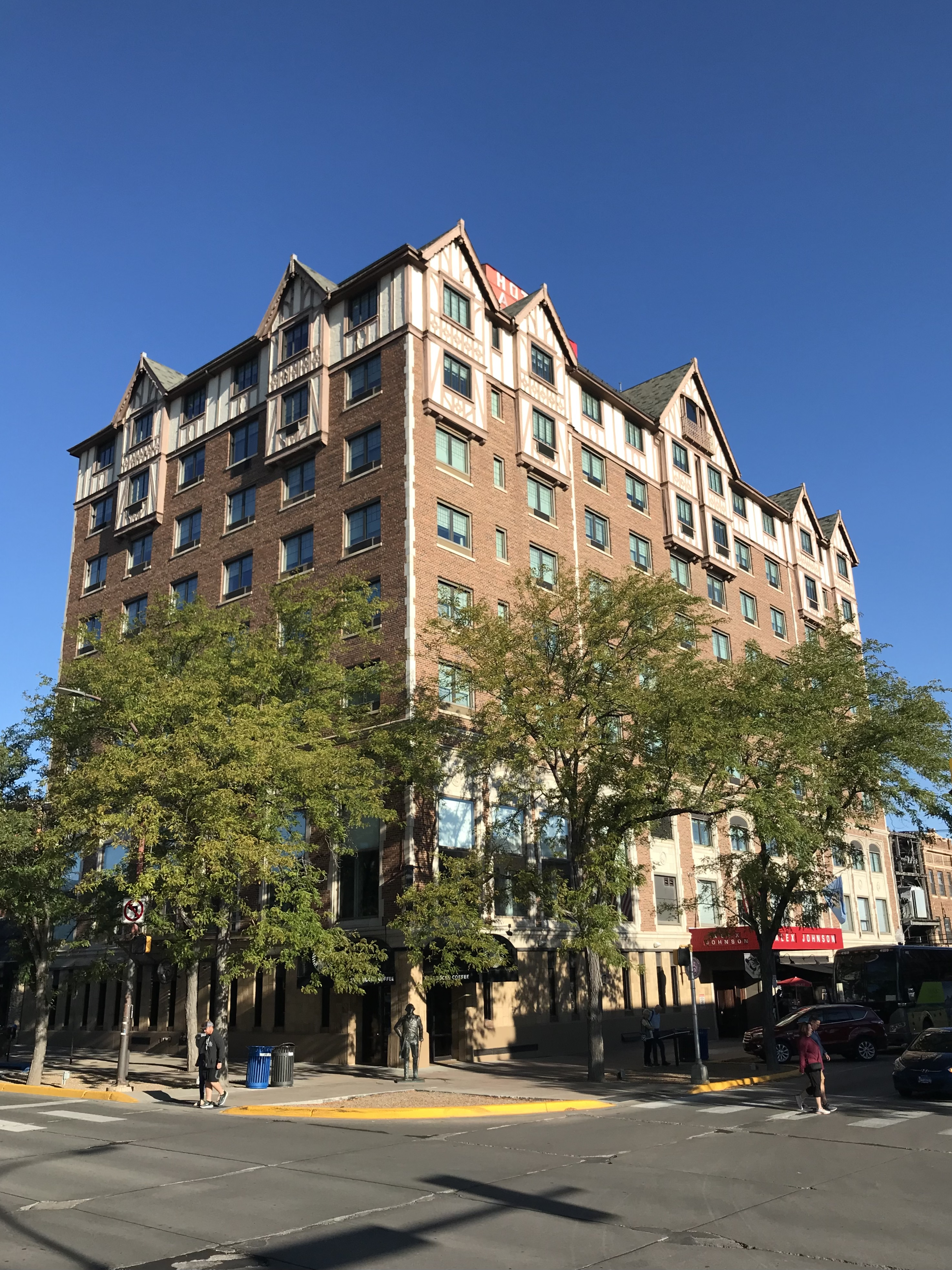
- Downtown Rapid City Journey Museum Dahl Arts Center Dakota Mill and Grain Hotel Alex Johnson

- Flag Seal Logo
- Nicknames: Gateway to the Black Hills, City of Presidents
- Interactive map of Rapid City, South Dakota
- Location within South Dakota
- Coordinates: 44.0711°N 103.2179°W
- Country: United States
- State: South Dakota
- County: Pennington
- Founded: February 1876
- Incorporated: February 1883
- Named for: Rapid Creek

Government
  - Type: Mayor–Council
  - Mayor: Jason Salamun
  - President: Stephen Tamang
  - Vice president: Callie Meyer
  - Councilmen: Josh Biberdorf; Lindsey Seachris; Bill Evans; Kevin Maher; Greg Strommen; John B. Roberts; Lance Lehmann; Laura Armstrong

Area
  - City: 56.049 sq mi (145.166 km^{2})
  - Land: 55.987 sq mi (145.006 km^{2})
  - Water: 0.062 sq mi (0.160 km^{2}) 0.11%
- Elevation: 3,356 ft (1,023 m)

Population (2020)
  - City: 74,703
  - Estimate (2025): 80,589
  - Rank: US: 462nd SD: 2nd
  - Density: 1,334.3/sq mi (515.17/km^{2})
  - Urban: 85,679 (US: 342nd)
  - Metro: 156,934 (US: 280th)
  - Combined: 186,393 (US: 148th)
- Demonym: Rapid Citian
- Time zone: UTC–7 (Mountain (MST))
  - Summer (DST): UTC–6 (MDT)
- ZIP Codes: 57701, 57702, 57703, 57709
- Area code: 605
- FIPS code: 46-52980
- GNIS feature ID: 1267543
- Highways: US 16, SD 44, SD 79, I-90, I-190
- Website: rcgov.org

Rapid City is a city in and the county seat of Pennington County, South Dakota, United States. The population was 74,703 as of the 2020 census, and was estimated at 80,589 in 2025, making it the second-most populous city in South Dakota, after Sioux Falls. The Rapid City metropolitan area has 156,934 residents in 2025.

It is located on the eastern slope of the Black Hills in western South Dakota and was named after Rapid Creek, where the settlement developed.

Known as the "Gateway to the Black Hills" and the "City of Presidents" because of the life-size bronze president statues downtown, Rapid City is split by a low mountain ridge that divides the city's western and eastern parts, called ‘The Gap.’ Ellsworth Air Force Base is on the city's outskirts. Camp Rapid, part of the South Dakota Army National Guard, is in the city's western part.

Rapid City is home to such attractions as Art Alley, Dinosaur Park, the City of Presidents walking tour, Chapel in the Hills, Storybook Island, and Main Street Square. The historic "Old West" town of Deadwood is nearby. In the neighboring Black Hills are the tourist attractions of Mount Rushmore, the Crazy Horse Memorial, Custer State Park, Wind Cave National Park, Jewel Cave National Monument, The Mammoth Site and the museum at the Black Hills Institute of Geological Research. To the city's east is Badlands National Park.

== History ==
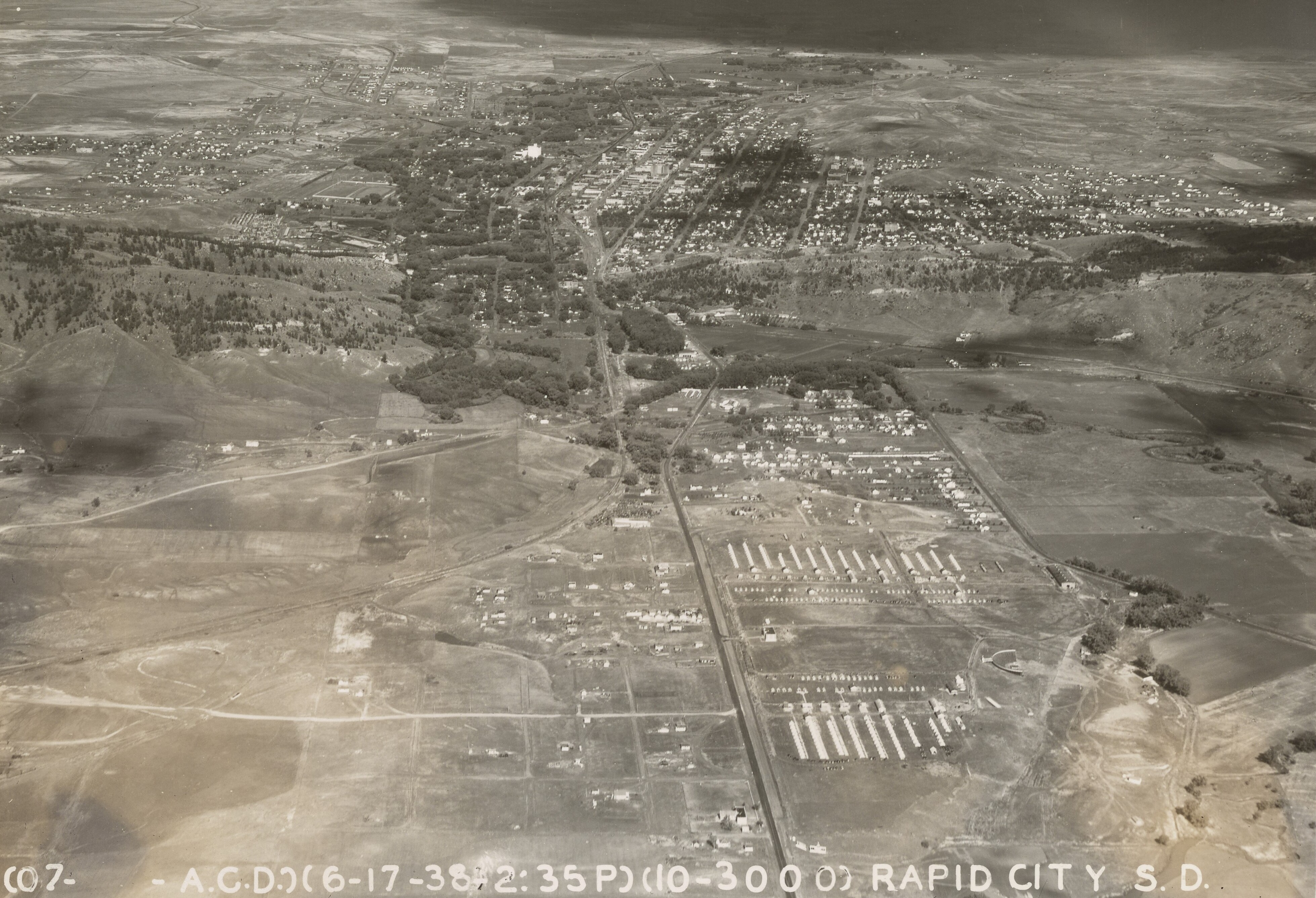
Rapid City in 1938

The public discovery of gold in 1874 by the Black Hills Expedition, led by George Armstrong Custer, brought a mass influx of European-American miners and settlers into Rapid City. A group of unsuccessful miners founded Rapid City in 1876, trying to create other chances; they promoted their new city as the "Gateway to the Black Hills"; it was originally known as Hay Camp. The "Gateway" nickname is shared by neighboring Box Elder. In February 1876, John Richard Brennan and Samuel Scott, with a small group of men, laid out Rapid City. It was eventually named for the spring-fed Rapid Creek that flows through it.

The land speculators measured off a square mile and designated the six blocks in the center as a business section. Committees were appointed to recruit prospective merchants and their families to locate in the settlement. Such merchants soon began selling supplies to miners and pioneers. The city's location on the edge of the Plains and Hills and its large river valley made it a natural hub for the railroads that were constructed in the late 1880s from both the south and east. By 1900, Rapid City had survived a boom and bust and was developing as an important regional trade center for the Upper Midwest.

The Black Hills had become popular in the late 1890s, but Rapid City became a more important destination in the 20th century. Local entrepreneurs promoted the sights, the availability of the automobile for individual transportation, and construction of improved roadways after World War I led to many more tourists to this area, including President Calvin Coolidge and the First Lady in summer 1927. Coolidge announced that he would not seek reelection in 1928 from his summer office in Rapid City. Gutzon Borglum, already a noted sculptor, began work on Mount Rushmore in 1927, and his son, Lincoln Borglum, continued the work after Gutzon's death in 1941. The work was halted due to the US need to invest in buildup for its entry into World War II; the sculpture was declared complete in 1941. However, Dinosaur Park, which was built in part to attract eventual Mount Rushmore tourists, is acknowledged for being the public attraction which began Rapid City's transformation into a major tourist destination. Dinosaur Park was initially built and opened in 1936, with overall construction being completed in 1938. Although tourism had sustained the city throughout the Great Depression of the 1930s, gasoline rationing during World War II decimated such travel. But investments in the defense industry and other war-related growth stimulated the placement of new military installations in the area, bringing more businesses and residents.

In 1930, the Rapid City Chamber of Commerce sent a letter inviting Al Capone to live in the Black Hills. South Dakota's governor did not support the idea, and Capone declined.

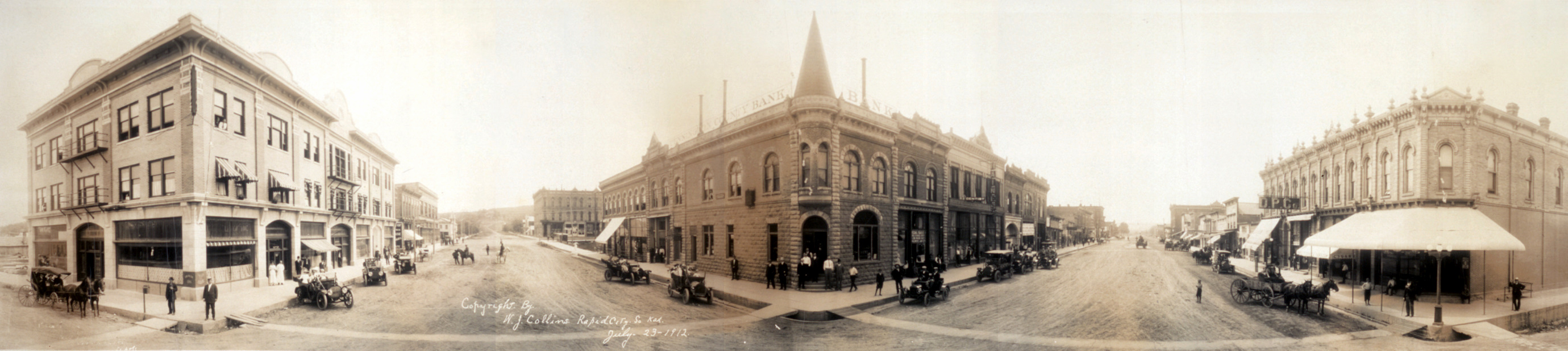
Panoramic view of Sixth and Main Streets in Rapid City, 1912

In the 1940s Rapid City benefited greatly from the opening of Rapid City Army Air Base, later Ellsworth Air Force Base, an Army Air Corps training base. The local population nearly doubled between 1940 and 1948, from almost 14,000 to nearly 27,000. Military families and civilian personnel soon took every available living space in town, and mobile home parks proliferated. Rapid City businesses profited from the military payroll.

During the Cold War, the government constructed missile installations in the area: a series of Nike Air Defense sites were constructed around Ellsworth in the 1950s. In the early 1960s three Titan missile launch sites were constructed; these contained a total of nine Titan I missiles in Rapid City's general vicinity. Beginning in November 1963, the land for 100 miles east, northeast and northwest of the city was dotted with construction of 150 Minuteman missile silos and 15 launch command centers. They were all deactivated in the early 1990s.

In 1949, city officials envisioned the city as a retail and wholesale trade center for the region. They developed a plan for growth that focused on a civic center, more downtown parking, new schools, and paved streets. A construction boom continued into the 1950s. Growth slowed in the 1960s.

After the Black Hills Flood of 1972, the worst natural disaster in South Dakota history, a building boom took place over the next decade to replace damaged structures. On June 9, 1972, heavy rains caused massive flash flooding along Rapid Creek through the city, killing 238 people and destroying more than $100 million in property. In response to this devastation, Rapid City received an outpouring of private donations and millions of dollars in federal aid. It was able to complete a major part of its 1949 plan: clearing the area along the Rapid Creek and making the floodplain a public park. In other areas, new homes and businesses were constructed to replace those that had been destroyed. Rushmore Plaza Civic Center and a new Central High School were built in part of the area that was cleared. The high school opened in 1978, with the graduating class that year attending classes in both the original school (housed in what is now Rapid City High School and community theater) and the new one.

The rebuilding generated construction and related jobs that partly insulated Rapid City from the drop in automotive tourism caused by the 1974 Oil Embargo, but tourism was depressed for most of a decade. In 1978, Rushmore Mall was built on the city's north edge, enhancing the city's status as a local retail center.

In 1980, the Supreme Court of the United States ruled in United States v. Sioux Nation of Indians that the federal government had not justly compensated the Sioux people for the Black Hills when it unilaterally broke a treaty guaranteeing the Black Hills to them. As a result, the federal government offered a financial settlement, but the Lakota Sioux declined on the principle that the theft of their land should not be validated. They still demand the return of the land. The settlement funds accrue interest. This land includes Rapid City, by far the largest modern settlement in the Black Hills. As of 2023, the dispute has not been settled.

In the 1980s, tourism increased again as the city hosted the annual Sturgis Motorcycle Rally; another decline occurred in the late 1990s. Fears that Ellsworth AFB would be closed under the BRAC review and base closure process in the 1990s and 2000s led to attempts to expand other sectors of the economy. Growth continued and the city expanded significantly during this period.

Today, Rapid City is South Dakota's primary city for tourism and recreation. With the federal government's approval of a Deep Underground Science and Engineering Laboratory at the Homestake Mine site in nearby Lead, Rapid City is primed for advancements in technology, medicine, and scientific research.

=== 1972 Rapid Creek flood ===
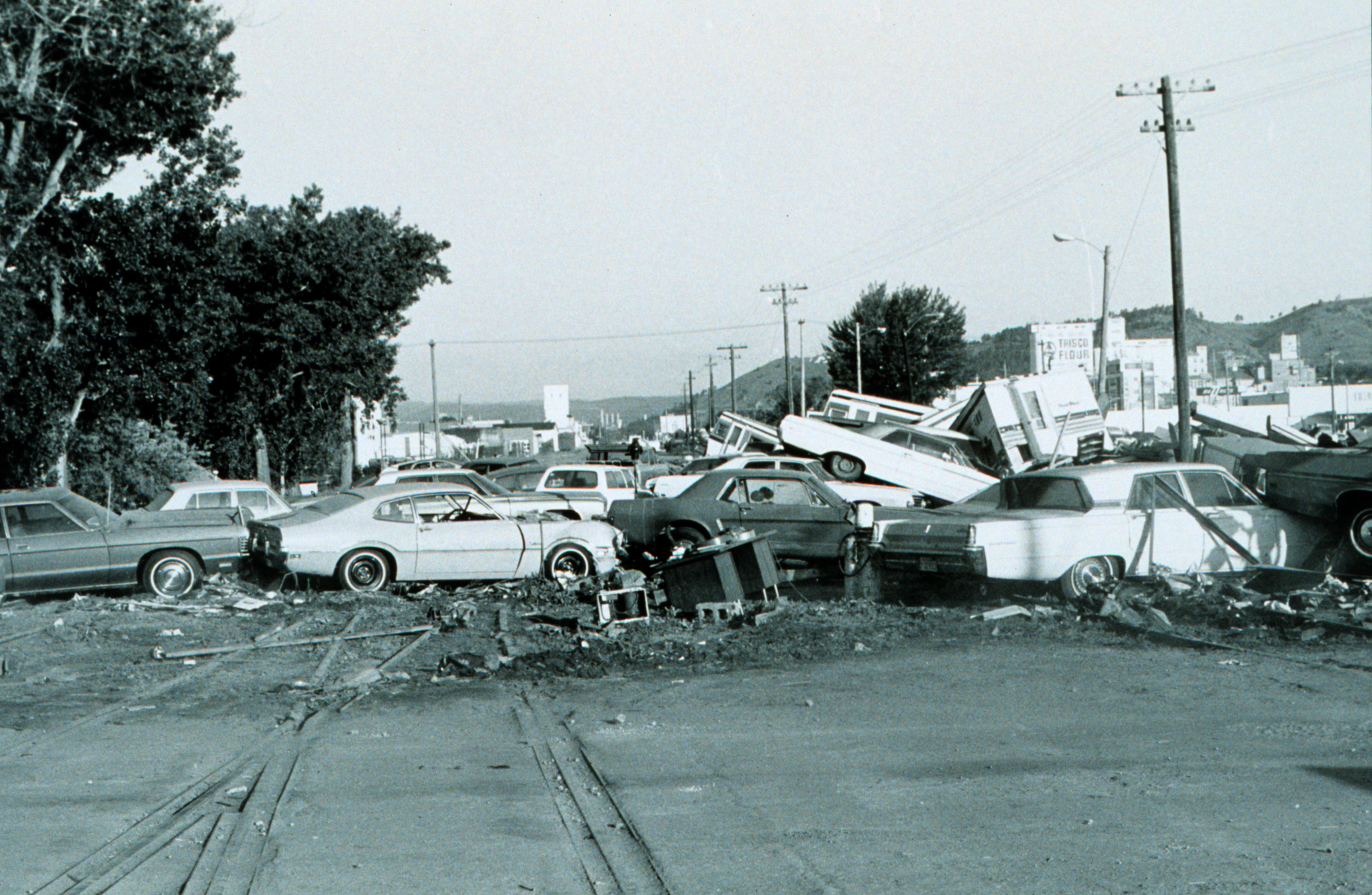
Cars thrown together by the 1972 flood

On June 9–10, 1972, extremely heavy rains over the eastern Black Hills of South Dakota produced record floods on Rapid Creek and other streams in the area. Nearly 15 inches (380 mm) of rain fell in about six hours near Nemo, and more than 10 inches (250 mm) of rain fell over an area of 60 square miles (160 km^{2}). According to the Red Cross, the resulting peak floods (which occurred after dark) left 238 people dead and 3,057 people injured. Total property destruction was estimated in excess of $160 million (about $964 million in 2018 dollars), which included 1,335 homes and 5,000 automobiles. The flood wrecked a popular children's park: Story Book Island. Flooding also destroyed a predominantely Native American neighborhood and disproportionately killed and displaced the city's Native population.

Runoff from this storm produced record floods (highest peak flows recorded) along Battle, Spring, Rapid, and Box Elder creeks. Smaller floods also occurred along Elk and Bear Butte creeks. Canyon Lake Dam, on the west side of Rapid City, broke the night of the flood, unleashing a wall of water down the creek. The 1972 flooding has an estimated recurrence interval of 500 years, meaning that each year there is a 0.2% chance (1 in 500) that a similar event will occur. The city has prohibited residential and business construction on its flood plain to prevent future flood damage. Today the flood plain is used for civic functions such as golf courses, parks, sports arenas, and arboretums, based mostly on the landscape and temporary use by people.

In 2007, the Rapid City Public Library created a 1972 Flood digital archive that collects survivors' stories, photos and news accounts of the flood. The Journey Museum has an interactive display on the 1972 flood; this is an ongoing project to give future generations the best idea of how the people were affected and what changes the city made as a result of the major losses of life and property. Plans include the memorialization of all those who died from the flood by the preparation of individual biographies, so they may be remembered more fully.

== Geography ==
Rapid City is located in the shadow of Black Elk Peak, which at 7,242 feet (2,207 m), is the highest point east of the Rocky Mountains.

According to the United States Census Bureau, the city has an area of 56.049 square miles (145.17 km^{2}), of which 55.987 square miles (145.01 km^{2}) is land and 0.062 square miles (0.16 km^{2}) (0.11%) is water.

Rapid City is located on the eastern edge of the Black Hills, and has developed on each side of the Dakota Hogback. Rapid City's "Westside" is located in the Red Valley between the foothills of the Black Hills proper and the Dakota Hogback, so named for the red Spearfish formation soils and the way the valley completely encircles the Black Hills. Rapid City has expanded into the foothills, with developments having been built on both ridges and in valleys developed, especially in the last 20 years. This arid edge area has a higher risk of wildfire, as shown by the Westberry Trails fire in 1988.

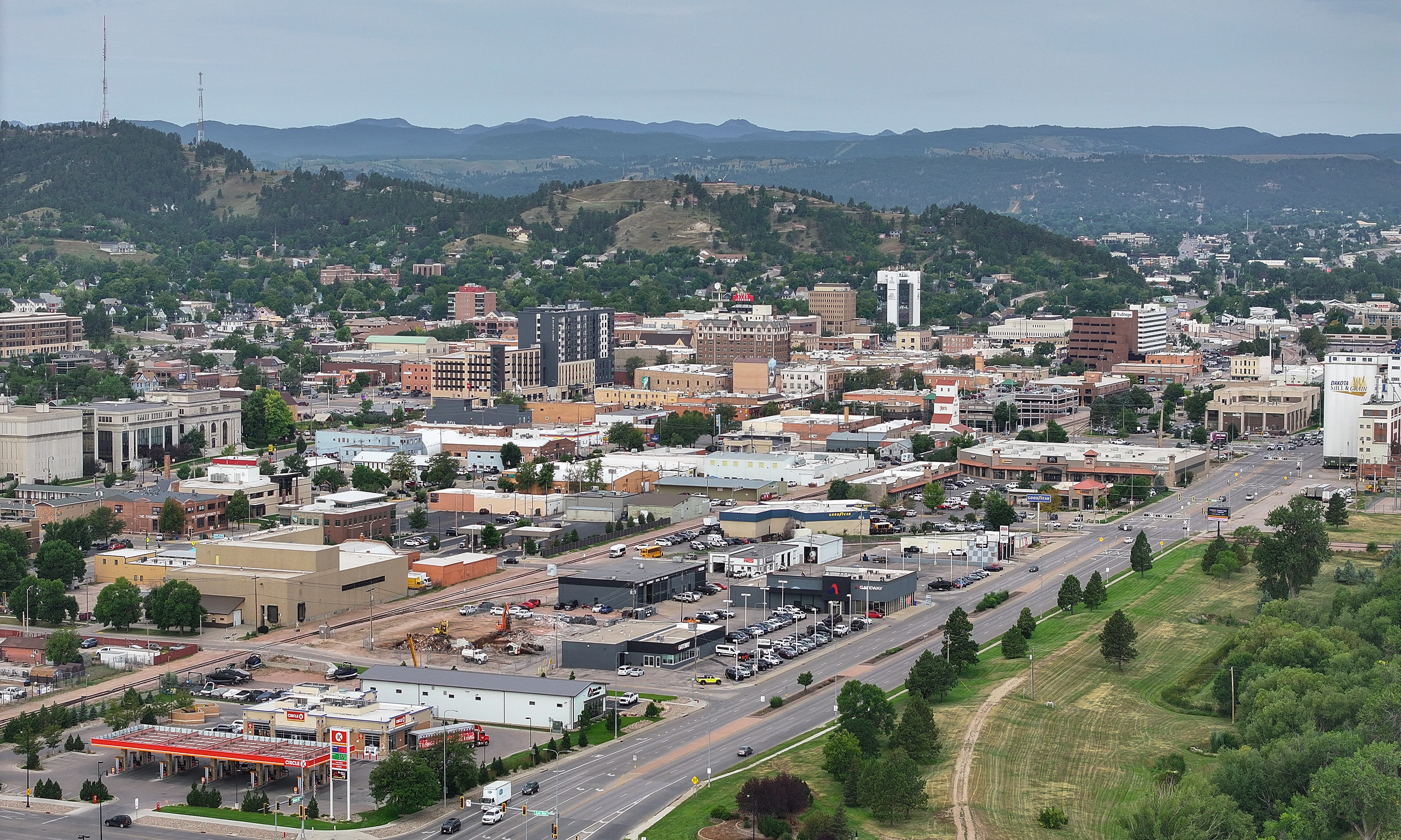
Aerial view of the city

Skyline Drive follows the summits of the Dakota Hogback south from near Rapid Gap (where Rapid Creek cuts through the Hogback) to a large high plateau that forms the current south edge of Rapid City. The Central and Eastern portions of Rapid City lie in the wide valley of Rapid Creek outside the Hogback. It includes a number of mesas rising a hundred feet or more above the floodplain.

=== Rapid Creek ===
Rapid Creek flows through Rapid City, emerging from Dark Canyon above Canyon Lake and flowing in a large arc north of downtown. It descends to the southeast where the valley widens. Since the flood damage of 1972, the city has prohibited most development in the floodplain of Rapid Creek. It has adapted this green space for public uses: a series of parks, arboretums, and bike trails, which have reconnected the city to the creek for residents.

To the north, a series of ridges separate Rapid Creek from Box Elder Creek. Both older and new residential areas and commercial areas have developed here, along I-90. To the south, the terrain rises more steeply to the southern widening of the Dakota Hogback into a plateau dividing the Rapid Creek drainage from Spring Creek.

=== Climate ===
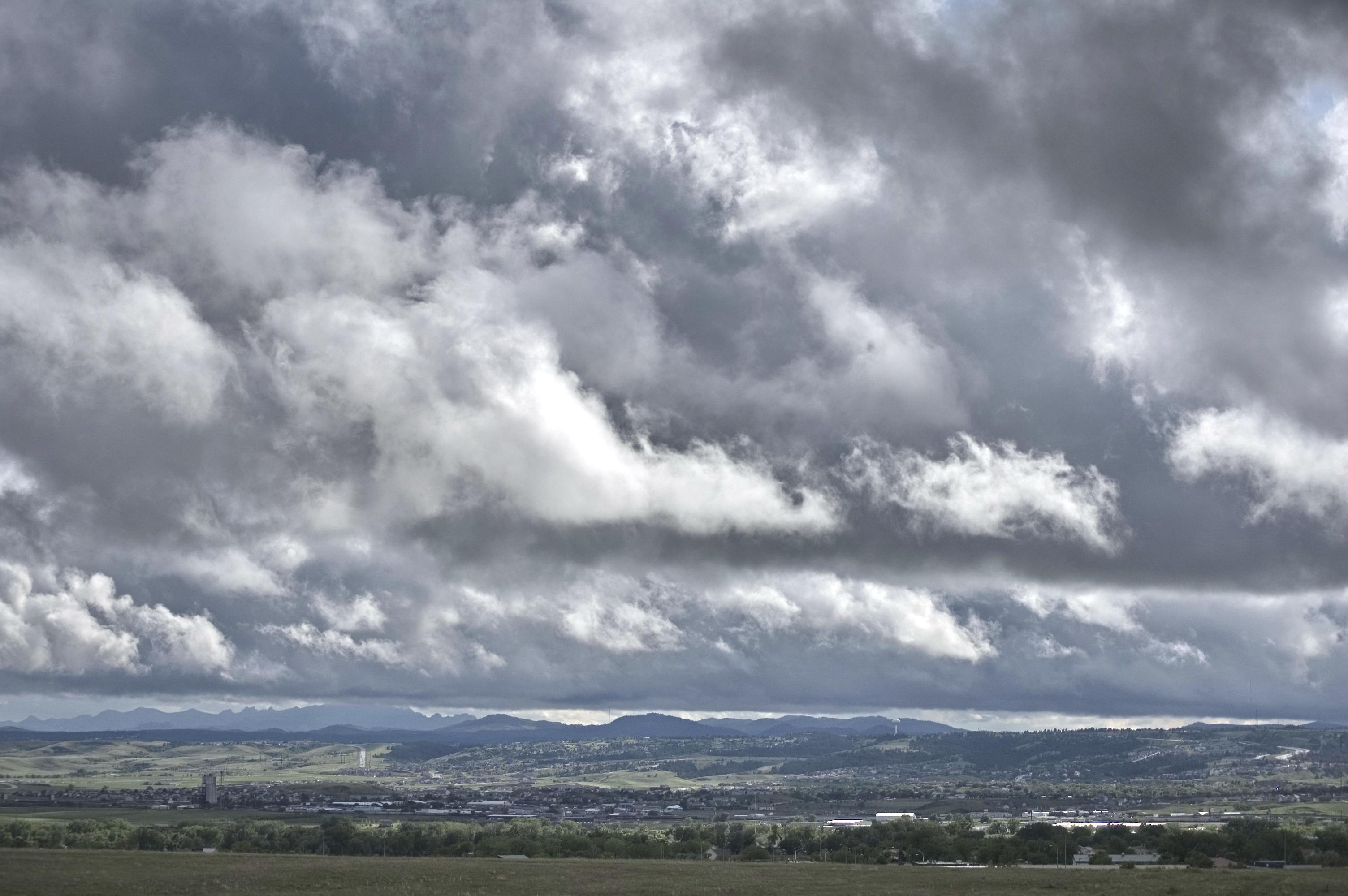
View of southern Rapid City from the east after a rainstorm, including a view of Black Elk Peak and the Black Hills

Rapid City has a transitional climate between a semi-arid climate (Köppen: BSk) and a hot-summer humid continental climate (Köppen: Dwa), and is part of USDA Hardiness zone 5b. Its location makes its climate unlike both the higher elevations of the Black Hills to the west and the Great Plains to the east. It is characterized by long arid summers and long dry winters, with short but distinct spring and autumn seasons. Precipitation averages 17.44 inches (443 mm) annually, but has historically ranged from 9.12 inches (231.6 mm) in 1974 to 27.7 inches (703.6 mm) in 1946.

Winters are cold and dry, and January is the coldest month with a daily mean temperature of 24.3 °F (−4.3 °C). Chinook winds can warm temperatures above 50 °F (10 °C), doing so on average about 20 times from December to February. Temperature inversions, however, occasionally produce warmer temperatures in the Black Hills. On average, highs do not climb above freezing on 43 days, while the low temperature reaches 0 °F (−17.8 °C) on an average of 18 nights. Snowfall is frequent but usually not heavy; March and April are typically the snowiest months. The seasonal total averages 48.5 inches (123.2 cm), although historically ranging from 16.9 inches (42.9 cm) during 1980–81 to 80.9 inches (205.5 cm) during 1985–86. Extensive snow cover does not remain for long, with only nine days seasonally with 5 inches (12.7 cm) or more on the ground. Measurable snow has occurred in every month except July.

The area warms rather gradually early in the year compared to locations farther east. The last measurable snow typically occurs in late April, although May snow occurs several times per decade. Toward the middle of the year, storms typically develop over the Black Hills during the afternoon and move onto the plains in the evening. Only in April through June have calendar-day precipitation amounts exceeding 3 inches (76.2 mm) been observed. June 15, 1963, with 3.78 inches (96 mm), holds the single-day rainfall record; the record-wettest month is May 1996 with 8.18 inches (207.8 mm). Rapid City has an average of twenty clear to partly cloudy days and 67% of its possible sunshine in June. This is the traditional "flood" season for Rapid and other creeks in the Eastern Hills. Temperatures warm rapidly as summer approaches.

Summer in Rapid City sees generally pleasant temperatures and is relatively dry and sunny. July is the warmest month of the year, with a daily mean temperature of 72.4 °F (22.4 °C). An average of 32 days reach 90 °F (32.2 °C)+ highs and 5 with 100 °F (37.8 °C)+ highs. Due to the elevation and aridity, lows rarely remain at or above 70 °F (21.1 °C) and during July and August fall to or below 50 °F (10 °C) on an average 7.6 days. Rapid City records an average of nine thunderstorm days in August, but only 1.56 inches (39.6 mm) of rain in that month.

Fall is a transition season: the average first freeze occurs in Rapid City on October 4 and in the Black Hills in late August through September. The Rapid City area's first snowfall is usually in October, although higher elevations sometimes receive significant snow in September. Occasional cold fronts moving through the area bring blustery northwest winds.

Sunshine is abundant in the region in all months except December, averaging 2850 hours, 64% of the possible total, per year.

Official extreme temperatures at the airport range from −31 °F (−35 °C) on February 2, 1996, up to 112 °F (44.4 °C) on July 25, 2026; the record low daily maximum is −18 °F (−27.8 °C) on February 2, 1989, while the record high daily minimum is 75 °F (23.9 °C) on July 8, 1985, and July 28, 1960. At downtown, official extreme temperatures range from −34 °F (−36.7 °C) on February 11, 1899, up to 110 °F (43.3 °C) on July 25, 2026.

Rapid City had the record for an extreme temperature drop of 47 °F (26.1 °C), which was achieved on January 10, 1911, from 60 °F (15.6 °C) to 13 °F (−10.6 °C). This was due to the Chinook wind, but the record was lost to Spearfish in 1942.

Climate data for Rapid City Regional Airport, South Dakota (1991−2020 normals, (Note: Mean monthly maxima and minima (i.e. the expected highest and lowest temperature readings at any point during the year or given month) calculated based on data at said location from 1991 to 2020.) extremes 1942−present) (Note: Official temperature and precipitation records for Rapid City kept at the old municipal airport from August 1942 to October 11, 1950, and at Rapid City Regional since October 12, 1950. Snowfall and snow depth records date to September 1, 1942, and the move to Rapid City Regional, respectively.)
Month	Jan	Feb	Mar	Apr	May	Jun	Jul	Aug	Sep	Oct	Nov	Dec	Year
Record high °F (°C)	76 (24)	75 (24)	87 (31)	93 (34)	98 (37)	109 (43)	112 (44)	107 (42)	104 (40)	96 (36)	83 (28)	75 (24)	112 (44)
Mean maximum °F (°C)	61.3 (16.3)	63.8 (17.7)	74.8 (23.8)	81.6 (27.6)	87.8 (31.0)	95.1 (35.1)	100.7 (38.2)	99.8 (37.7)	96.4 (35.8)	86.3 (30.2)	72.3 (22.4)	62.0 (16.7)	102.8 (39.3)
Mean daily maximum °F (°C)	36.0 (2.2)	38.1 (3.4)	48.2 (9.0)	56.6 (13.7)	66.5 (19.2)	77.6 (25.3)	86.4 (30.2)	85.4 (29.7)	76.1 (24.5)	60.4 (15.8)	47.3 (8.5)	37.2 (2.9)	59.7 (15.4)
Daily mean °F (°C)	24.3 (−4.3)	26.1 (−3.3)	35.4 (1.9)	43.9 (6.6)	54.1 (12.3)	64.6 (18.1)	72.4 (22.4)	70.8 (21.6)	61.3 (16.3)	47.1 (8.4)	34.6 (1.4)	25.6 (−3.6)	46.7 (8.2)
Mean daily minimum °F (°C)	12.7 (−10.7)	14.0 (−10.0)	22.6 (−5.2)	31.2 (−0.4)	41.7 (5.4)	51.6 (10.9)	58.5 (14.7)	56.2 (13.4)	46.4 (8.0)	33.7 (0.9)	21.9 (−5.6)	13.9 (−10.1)	33.7 (0.9)
Mean minimum °F (°C)	−9.6 (−23.1)	−7.5 (−21.9)	1.7 (−16.8)	15.9 (−8.9)	27.0 (−2.8)	39.7 (4.3)	48.2 (9.0)	45.2 (7.3)	31.6 (−0.2)	15.1 (−9.4)	2.0 (−16.7)	−7.5 (−21.9)	−17.2 (−27.3)
Record low °F (°C)	−27 (−33)	−31 (−35)	−21 (−29)	−1 (−18)	18 (−8)	31 (−1)	39 (4)	37 (3)	18 (−8)	—	−19 (−28)	−30 (−34)	−31 (−35)
Average precipitation inches (mm)	0.31 (7.9)	0.50 (13)	0.91 (23)	2.08 (53)	3.45 (88)	2.87 (73)	2.28 (58)	1.59 (40)	1.22 (31)	1.41 (36)	0.47 (12)	0.35 (8.9)	17.44 (443)
Average snowfall inches (cm)	5.3 (13)	7.7 (20)	8.4 (21)	10.1 (26)	1.5 (3.8)	0.0 (0.0)	0.0 (0.0)	0.0 (0.0)	0.1 (0.25)	3.0 (7.6)	5.7 (14)	6.7 (17)	48.5 (123)
Average extreme snow depth inches (cm)	3.3 (8.4)	4.0 (10)	5.0 (13)	4.6 (12)	1.4 (3.6)	0.0 (0.0)	0.0 (0.0)	0.0 (0.0)	0.0 (0.0)	1.6 (4.1)	3.0 (7.6)	3.4 (8.6)	9.3 (24)
Average precipitation days (≥ 0.01 in)	5.7	6.6	7.0	10.5	12.6	12.5	9.8	7.9	6.6	7.1	5.1	5.0	96.4
Average snowy days (≥ 0.1 in)	6.1	7.1	4.1	4.3	0.4	0.0	0.0	0.0	0.1	1.7	3.6	5.4	32.8
Average relative humidity (%)	63.5	65.1	63.8	58.6	60.8	61.9	56.2	52.6	53.5	54.2	62.2	64.8	59.8
Mean monthly sunshine hours	163.5	174.0	233.9	246.9	274.3	310.5	335.5	323.8	261.9	226.0	156.6	149.9	2,856.8
Percentage possible sunshine	57	59	63	61	60	67	72	75	70	66	54	54	64
Source 1: NOAA (relative humidity and sun 1961−1990)
Source 2:

Climate data for Rapid City Downtown, South Dakota (1991−2020 normals, (Note: Mean monthly maxima and minima (i.e. the expected highest and lowest temperature readings at any point during the year or given month) calculated based on data at said location from 1991 to 2020.) extremes 1888−present) (Note: Official temperature and precipitation records for Rapid City kept in WBO Rapid City since from 1 January 1888 to 4 November 1972, and at the WFO Rapid City since January 1, 1996. Snowfall and snow depth records date to September 1, 1942, and the move to Rapid City Regional, respectively.)
Month	Jan	Feb	Mar	Apr	May	Jun	Jul	Aug	Sep	Oct	Nov	Dec	Year
Record high °F (°C)	73 (23)	74 (23)	85 (29)	91 (33)	99 (37)	106 (41)	110 (43)	106 (41)	103 (39)	96 (36)	83 (28)	79 (26)	110 (43)
Mean maximum °F (°C)	62.4 (16.9)	62.5 (16.9)	73.2 (22.9)	80.4 (26.9)	86.6 (30.3)	94.6 (34.8)	99.0 (37.2)	97.4 (36.3)	93.9 (34.4)	83.4 (28.6)	71.4 (21.9)	61.5 (16.4)	100.8 (38.2)
Mean daily maximum °F (°C)	36.5 (2.5)	38.3 (3.5)	47.4 (8.6)	55.0 (12.8)	65.3 (18.5)	76.2 (24.6)	84.4 (29.1)	83.4 (28.6)	76.1 (24.5)	58.8 (14.9)	47.0 (8.3)	37.6 (3.1)	58.8 (14.9)
Daily mean °F (°C)	26.4 (−3.1)	27.9 (−2.3)	36.5 (2.5)	44.5 (6.9)	54.9 (12.7)	65.4 (18.6)	73.0 (22.8)	71.6 (22.0)	62.4 (16.9)	48.3 (9.1)	36.8 (2.7)	28.1 (−2.2)	48.0 (8.9)
Mean daily minimum °F (°C)	16.2 (−8.8)	17.5 (−8.1)	25.6 (−3.6)	34.0 (1.1)	44.6 (7.0)	54.6 (12.6)	61.6 (16.4)	59.9 (15.5)	50.8 (10.4)	37.9 (3.3)	26.6 (−3.0)	18.6 (−7.4)	37.3 (2.9)
Mean minimum °F (°C)	−7.0 (−21.7)	−3.1 (−19.5)	4.4 (−15.3)	18.1 (−7.7)	31.6 (−0.2)	43.9 (6.6)	52.6 (11.4)	50.0 (10.0)	36.3 (2.4)	20.2 (−6.6)	7.3 (−13.7)	−3.9 (−19.9)	−13.2 (−25.1)
Record low °F (°C)	−33 (−36)	−34 (−37)	−17 (−27)	−8 (−22)	19 (−7)	31 (−1)	40 (4)	36 (2)	15 (−9)	−13 (−25)	−15 (−26)	−28 (−33)	−34 (−37)
Average precipitation inches (mm)	0.31 (7.9)	0.53 (13)	0.94 (24)	2.26 (57)	4.12 (105)	3.33 (85)	2.62 (67)	2.17 (55)	1.40 (36)	1.49 (38)	0.47 (12)	0.35 (8.9)	20.02 (509)
Average snowfall inches (cm)	5.3 (13)	9.1 (23)	10.4 (26)	10.0 (25)	2.2 (5.6)	0.1 (0.25)	0.0 (0.0)	0.0 (0.0)	0.1 (0.25)	3.3 (8.4)	6.5 (17)	6.6 (17)	53.7 (136)
Average extreme snow depth inches (cm)	2.6 (6.6)	4.4 (11)	4.9 (12)	4.5 (11)	0.8 (2.0)	0.0 (0.0)	0.0 (0.0)	0.0 (0.0)	0.0 (0.0)	1.9 (4.8)	3.4 (8.6)	3.6 (9.1)	8.8 (22)
Average precipitation days (≥ 0.01 in)	5.7	6.6	7.0	10.5	12.6	12.5	9.8	7.9	6.6	7.1	5.1	5.0	96.4
Average snowy days (≥ 0.1 in)	6.1	7.1	4.1	4.3	0.4	0.0	0.0	0.0	0.1	1.7	3.6	5.4	32.8
Average relative humidity (%)	63.5	65.1	63.8	58.6	60.8	61.9	56.2	52.6	53.5	54.2	62.2	64.8	59.8
Mean monthly sunshine hours	163.5	174.0	233.9	246.9	274.3	310.5	335.5	323.8	261.9	226.0	156.6	149.9	2,856.8
Percentage possible sunshine	57	59	63	61	60	67	72	75	70	66	54	54	64
Source: NOAA (relative humidity and sun 1961−1990)

== Demographics ==
Historical population
Census	Pop.	Note	%±
1880	939		—
1890	2,128		126.6%
1900	1,342		−36.9%
1910	3,454		157.4%
1920	5,777		67.3%
1930	10,464		81.1%
1940	13,844		32.3%
1950	25,312		82.8%
1960	42,390		67.5%
1970	43,846		3.4%
1980	46,492		6.0%
1990	54,523		17.3%
2000	59,607		9.3%
2010	67,956		14.0%
2020	74,703		9.9%
2025 (est.)	80,589		7.9%
U.S. Decennial Census; 2020 Census

According to realtor website Zillow, the average price of a home as of September 30, 2026, in Rapid City was $360,913.

As of the 2024 American Community Survey, there were 33,659 estimated households in Rapid City with an average of 2.27 persons per household. The city has a median household income of $75,467. Approximately 10.6% of the city's population lives at or below the poverty line. Rapid City has an estimated 63.1% employment rate, with 37.1% of the population holding a bachelor's degree or higher and 93.5% holding a high school diploma. There were 37,216 housing units at an average density of 664.73 per square mile (256.65/km^{2}).

The median age in the city was 37.1 years.

Rapid City, South Dakota – racial and ethnic composition Note: the US Census treats Hispanic/Latino as an ethnic category. This table excludes Latinos from the racial categories and assigns them to a separate category. Hispanics/Latinos may be of any race.
Race / ethnicity (NH = non-Hispanic)	Pop. 1990	Pop. 2000	Pop. 2010	Pop. 2020	% 1990	% 2000	% 2010	% 2020
White alone (NH)	47,511	49,621	53,412	54,444	87.14%	83.25%	78.60%	72.88%
Black or African American alone (NH)	676	550	734	1,080	1.24%	0.92%	1.08%	1.45%
Native American or Alaska Native alone (NH)	4,576	5,728	7,808	9,221	8.39%	9.61%	11.49%	12.34%
Asian alone (NH)	518	586	787	1,188	0.95%	0.98%	1.16%	1.59%
Pacific Islander alone (NH)	—	32	48	45	—	0.05%	0.07%	0.06%
Other race alone (NH)	27	43	40	250	0.05%	0.07%	0.06%	0.33%
Mixed race or multiracial (NH)	—	1,397	2,311	4,513	—	2.34%	3.40%	6.04%
Hispanic or Latino (any race)	1,215	1,650	2,816	3,962	2.23%	2.77%	4.14%	5.30%
Total	54,523	59,607	67,956	74,703	100.00%	100.00%	100.00%	100.00%

=== 2020 census ===
As of the 2020 census, there were 74,703 people, 31,261 households, and 17,755 families residing in the city. The population density was 1,365.69 inhabitants per square mile (527.30/km^{2}). There were 33,544 housing units at an average density of 613.24 per square mile (236.77/km^{2}). The racial makeup of the city was 74.63% White, 1.50% African American, 13.19% Native American, 1.62% Asian, 0.07% Pacific Islander, 1.16% from some other races and 7.85% from two or more races. Hispanic or Latino people of any race were 5.30% of the population.

=== 2010 census ===
As of the 2010 census, there were 67,956 people, 28,586 households, and 16,957 families residing in the city. The population density was 1,226.49 inhabitants per square mile (473.55/km^{2}). There were 30,254 housing units at an average density of 546.03 per square mile (210.82/km^{2}). The racial makeup of the city was 80.43% White, 1.12% African American, 12.38% Native American, 1.17% Asian, 0.08% Pacific Islander, 0.70% from some other races and 4.11% from two or more races. Hispanic or Latino people of any race were 4.14% of the population.

There were 28,586 households, of which 29.9% had children under the age of 18 living with them, 41.2% were married couples living together, 13.1% had a female householder with no husband present, 5.1% had a male householder with no wife present, and 40.7% were non-families. 32.9% of all households were made up of individuals, and 11.1% had someone living alone who was 65 years of age or older. The average household size was 2.29 and the average family size was 2.90.

The median age in the city was 35.6 years. 23.9% of residents were under the age of 18; 10.6% were between the ages of 18 and 24; 25.7% were from 25 to 44; 25% were from 45 to 64; and 14.5% were 65 years of age or older. The gender makeup of the city was 49.5% male and 50.5% female.

=== 2000 census ===
As of the 2000 census, there were 59,607 people, 23,969 households, and 15,220 families residing in the city. The population density was 1,336.70 inhabitants per square mile (516.10/km^{2}). There were 25,096 housing units at an average density of 562.78 per square mile (217.29/km^{2}). The racial makeup of the city was 84.33% White, 0.97% African American, 10.14% Native American, 1.00% Asian, 0.06% Pacific Islander, 0.73% from some other races and 2.77% from two or more races. Hispanic or Latino people of any race were 2.77% of the population.

There were 23,969 households, out of which 31.2% had children under the age of 18 living with them, 46.7% were married couples living together, 12.6% had a female householder with no husband present, and 36.5% were non-families. 29.4% of all households were made up of individuals, and 10.0% had someone living alone who was 65 years of age or older. The average household size was 2.39 and the average family size was 2.96.

In the city, the population was spread out, with 25.3% under the age of 18, 11.8% from 18 to 24, 28.7% from 25 to 44, 20.9% from 45 to 64, and 13.2% who were 65 years of age or older. The median age was 35 years. For every 100 females, there were 96.2 males. For every 100 females age 18 and over, there were 93.6 males.

The median income for a household in the city was $35,978, and the median income for a family was $44,818. Males had a median income of $30,985 versus $21,913 for females. The per capita income for the city was $19,445. About 9.4% of families and 12.7% of the population were below the poverty line, including 17.6% of those under age 18 and 6.9% of those age 65 or over.

=== Statistical area ===
The population of the Rapid City metropolitan statistical area (Pennington and Meade Counties) was 139,074 at the 2020 census. Rapid City is also included in the Rapid City-Spearfish combined statistical area, which, with the addition of Lawrence County, had a 2020 census population of 164,842.

== Economy ==
Rapid City's economy is diverse, but industry is a small portion. Heavy and medium industrial activities include a Portland cement plant (constructed and owned for 84 years by the State of South Dakota and sold in 2003 to Grupo Cementos de Chihuahua, or GCC, a Mexican-based conglomerate); Black Hills Ammunition, an ammunition and reloading supplies manufacturing company; several custom sawmills, a lime plant, a computer peripheral component manufacturing plant, and several farm and ranch equipment manufacturers. Of particular note, this city is the center for the manufacture of Black Hills gold jewelry, a popular product with tourists and Westerners in general. The city is the site of the only American manufacturer of stamping machines used for the labeling of plywood and chipboard products.

Most gold mining has ceased in the Black Hills and was never conducted in or near Rapid City. Regional mining operations include for sand and gravel, as well as the raw materials for lime and Portland cement (including chemical-grade limestone, taconite iron ore, and gypsum) remains an important part of the economy.

The largest sector of the Rapid City economy is government services, including local, state, and federal. Major employers include Ellsworth Air Force Base, home of the 28th Bomb Wing flying the B-1B long-range bomber; the Army National Guard based at Camp Rapid and hosting annual exercises in the Black Hills, drawing troops from five to ten states; and various federal agencies, including the National Park Service, US Forest Service, and Indian Health Service.

Monument Health covers one of the largest geographic service areas in the United States. The health care sector employs more than 8,000 persons in the Rapid City area.

Tourism constitutes a major portion of the Rapid City economy, due to the proximity of Mount Rushmore, Sturgis, home of the Sturgis Motorcycle Rally; Deadwood, and other attractions in the Black Hills. Rapid City provides tourist services for Rally goers during the first week of August and can host conventions. Various minor attractions, including wildlife parks, specialty shops, caves, water parks, private museums, and other businesses are found in and near Rapid City.

Other economic sectors include financial service, insurance and investing companies. As noted, the city has a strong medical services sector, and several institutions of higher education. Rapid City is also the major market town for much of five states, drawing commerce from more than half of South Dakota, and large portions of North Dakota, Montana, Wyoming, and the Nebraska Panhandle.

The real compound annual growth rate of the gross domestic product of the Rapid City Metropolitan Statistical Area was 2.6% for 2001–2013.

== Arts and culture ==
=== Places of interest ===
- Dinosaur Park
- Berlin Wall in Memorial Park
- The Journey Museum and Gardens
- Rushmore Mall
- Story Book Island
- Main Street Square
- Quarter Pounder statue

=== Cultural resources ===
- The Journey Museum and Learning Center
- Museum of Geology
- Dahl Arts Center
- Suzie Cappa Art Center
- The Monument
- Black Hills Playhouse
- Storybook Island Theater
- Art Alley Gallery
- The Performing Arts Center of Rapid City
- Black Hills Community Theatre
- Black Hills Symphony Orchestra
- Black Hills Chamber Orchestra
- Prairie Edge Art Gallery
- Chapel in the Hills
- Main Street Square

Rapid City has invested in public sculptures, notably "The City of Presidents" series of life-sized bronze statues depicting each former President of the United States, located on street corners in the downtown area.

=== Library ===
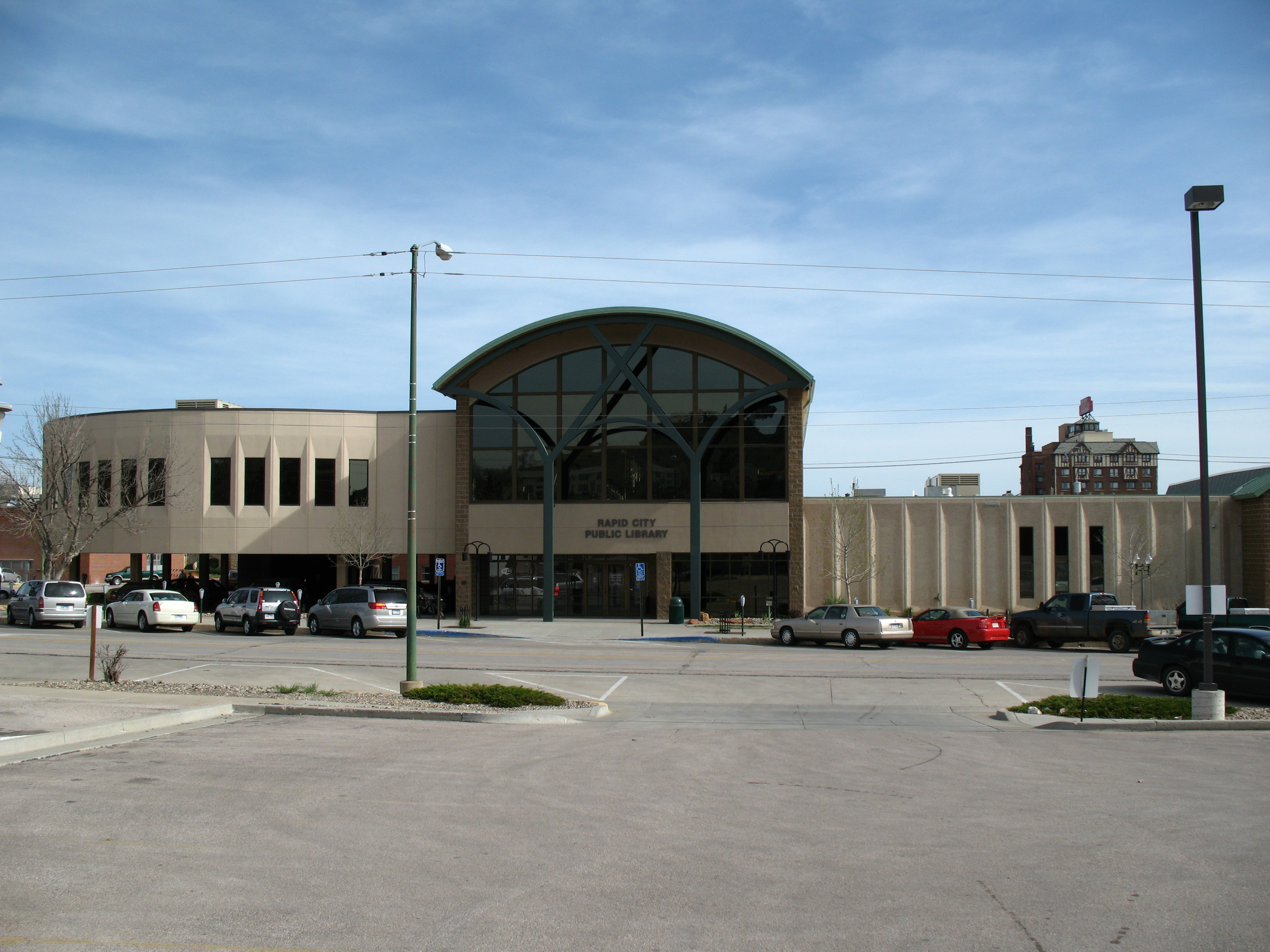
Rapid City Public Library

The Rapid City Public Library is a major resource for education.

== Sports ==
=== Active teams ===
- The Rapid City Rush is a minor league ice hockey team in the ECHL, founded in 2008 and currently affiliated with the Calgary Flames of the National Hockey League since 2022.
- American Legion Baseball has two teams, Post 22 and Post 320.
- The Expedition League, a summer collegiate baseball league, is headquartered in Rapid City, although no teams currently play there.

=== Defunct teams ===
- The Black Hills Posse was a professional basketball club that competed in the International Basketball Association beginning in the 1995–96 season.
- The Black Hills Gold was a professional basketball club that competed in the International Basketball Association during the 1999–2000 season.
- The Rapid City Flying Aces were an indoor football team that competed between 2000 and 2006 in the Indoor Football League, United Indoor Football, and National Indoor Football League, changing names from season to season.
- The Rapid City Thrillers were a professional basketball club that competed in the Continental Basketball Association beginning in the 1987–88 season through the 1996–97 season.
- The Rapid City Marshals were an indoor football team that competed in the Champions Indoor Football league from 2022 to 2024.

=== Other teams and events ===
- Rapid City has two public high schools who field teams that compete in the SDHSAA, as well as two private schools.
- The South Dakota Mines Hardrockers field 13 total varsity sports that compete at the NCAA Division II level in the Rocky Mountain Athletic Conference.
- The Lakota Nation Invitational has been held annually at the Rushmore Plaza Civic Center since 1979.

== Education ==
Rapid City institutions of higher education include the South Dakota School of Mines and Technology, Oglala Lakota College's He Sapa College Center, Black Hills State University - Rapid City University Center (includes classes and degrees through five other South Dakota post-secondary Institutions), National American University, Western Dakota Technical Institute, Black Hills Beauty College, John Witherspoon College, and several small sectarian preacher training schools.

Black Hills State University is located in nearby Spearfish and offers several classes in Rapid City. A South Dakota State University nurse training program is based in Rapid City.

In 2013, 26.6% of Rapid City residents 25 or older had earned a bachelor's degree or higher. This is on par with the average educational attainment in the United States. The highest rates of educational attainment in South Dakota can be found in metropolitan areas of Rapid City and Sioux Falls.

The area is served by the Rapid City Area Schools District 51-4. It operates the Rapid City School. In the 2025-26 academic year, the district reported a total of 12,040 students.

All of the city area, except for the airport territory, is within the Rapid City Area Schools District 51-4. There are three high schools within the district: Rapid City Central High School; Stevens High School; and Rapid City High School, which also houses the Performing Arts Center. The middle schools include East, North, South, Southwest, and West. There are 16 elementary schools within the district. These are Black Hawk, Canyon Lake, Corral Drive, General Beadle, Grandview, Horace Mann, Kibben Kuster, Knollwood Heights, Meadowbrook, Pinedale, Rapid Valley, Robbinsdale, South Canyon, South Park, Valley View, and Woodrow Wilson. The area containing the airport is in the Douglas School District 51-1.

There are also various private schools in Rapid City. The city has four Christian high schools: Saint Thomas More, Rapid City Christian High School, Liberty Baptist Academy, and Open Bible Christian School. Rapid City also has various private grade schools, including St. Paul's Lutheran School of the WELS.

== Media ==
=== AM radio ===
AM radio stations
Frequency	Call sign	Name	Format	Owner	City of License	Broadcast Market
580 AM	KZMX	580 Country	Country	Mt. Rushmore Broadcasting, Inc.	Hot Springs	Rapid City
810 AM	KBHB	Five State Ranch Radio	Farm	HomeSlice Media Group, LLC	Sturgis	Rapid City
920 AM	KKLS	The Cowboy	Classic Country	HomeSlice Media Group, LLC	Rapid City	Rapid City
980 AM	KDSJ		Oldies	Goldrush Broadcasting, Inc.	Deadwood	Rapid City
1150 AM	KIMM	Fox Sports Rapid City	Sports	Gunslinger Radio, Inc.	Rapid City	Rapid City
1340 AM	KTOQ	ESPN Rapid City	Sports	Haugo Broadcasting, Inc.	Rapid City	Rapid City
1380 AM	KOTA	News Radio KOTA	News/Talk	Riverfront Broadcasting	Rapid City	Rapid City

=== FM radio ===
FM radio stations
Frequency	Call sign	Name	Format	Owner	Target city/market	City of license
88.3 FM	KLMP	The Light	Christian	Bethesda Christian Broadcasting	Rapid City	Rapid City
88.7 FM	K204FB	KILI-FM	Community Radio; KILI-FM translator	Lakota Communications Inc.	Rapid City	Rapid City
89.3 FM	KBHE	South Dakota Public Broadcasting	NPR	SD Board of Directors for Educational Telecommunications	Rapid City	Rapid City
89.9 FM	KJRC	Real Presence Radio	Catholic Radio	Real Presence Radio	Rapid City	Rapid City
90.3 FM	KASD	Bott Radio Network	Christian	Bott Radio Network	Rapid City	Rapid City
91.3 FM	KTEQ-FM	K-Tech	Alternative	South Dakota School of Mines and Technology Educational Radio Council	Rapid City	Rapid City
91.7 FM	K218DX	CSN International	Christian; KAWZ-FM translator	CSN International	Rapid City	Box Elder
92.3 FM	KQRQ-FM	Q92.3	Classic Hits	Riverfront Broadcasting	Rapid City	Rapid City
93.1 FM	KRCS	Hot 93.1	Top 40	HomeSlice Media Group, LLC	Rapid City	Sturgis
93.9 FM	KKMK	93.9 The Mix	Hot AC	HomeSlice Media Group, LLC	Rapid City	Rapid City
94.7 FM	K234BR	Real Presence Radio	Catholic Radio; KJRC Translator	Real Presence Radio	Rapid City	Rapid City
95.1 FM	KSQY	K-Sky	Album-Oriented Rock	Haugo Broadcasting, Inc.	Rapid City	Deadwood
95.9 FM	KZZI	The Eagle	Country	Riverfront Broadcasting	Rapid City	Belle Fourche
96.3 FM	K242BK	The Eagle	Country; KZZI Translator	Riverfront Broadcasting	Rapid City	Rapid City
97.1 FM	KFND-LP		Religious	Calvary Chapel of the Black Hills	Rapid City	Rapid City
97.5 FM	K248BT	Hot 93.1	Top 40; KRCS Translator	HomeSlice Media Group, LLC	Rapid City	Rapid City
97.9 FM	KVPC	VCY America	Christian	VCY America, Inc.	Rapid City	Rapid City
98.7 FM	KOUT	Kat Country 98.7	Country	HomeSlice Media Group, LLC	Rapid City	Rapid City
99.5 FM	KRKI-FM1	99-5/107-9 True Country	Classic Country; KRKI-FM booster	Bad Lands Broadcasting	Rapid City	Rapid City
100.3 FM	KFXS	100.3 The Fox	Classic Rock	HomeSlice Media Group, LLC	Rapid City	Rapid City
100.7 FM	K264CP	News Radio KOTA	News/Talk; KOTA-AM Translator	Riverfront Broadcasting	Rapid City	Rapid City
101.1 FM	KDDX	X-Rock	Active Rock	Riverfront Broadcasting	Rapid City	Spearfish
101.9 FM	KFMH-FM1	Kool 101.9	Oldies; KFMH-FM booster	Bad Lands Broadcasting	Rapid City	Rapid City
102.7 FM	KXMZ	Hits 102.7	Hot AC	Haugo Broadcasting, Inc.	Rapid City	Box Elder
103.5 FM	K278AN	X-Rock	Active Rock; KDDX-FM translator	Riverfront Broadcasting	Rapid City	Rapid City
104.1 FM	KIQK	Kick 104	Country	Haugo Broadcasting, Inc.	Rapid City	Rapid City
104.7 FM	K284BA	The Cowboy	Classic Country; KKLS-AM Translator	HomeSlice Media Group, LLC	Rapid City	Rapid City
105.7 FM	K289AI	ESPN Rapid City	Sports	Haugo Broadcasting, Inc.	Rapid City	Rapid City
106.3 FM	KZLK	Z106.3	1980s	Riverfront Broadcasting	Rapid City	Rapid City
106.7 FM	K294BT	Fox Sports Rapid City	Sports; KIMM-AM Translator	Black Hills Broadcasting, LLC	Rapid City	Rapid City
107.1 FM	KSLT	Power 107.1	Christian Contemporary	Northwestern Media	Rapid City	Spearfish
107.9 FM	KXZT	99-5/107-9 True Country	Country	Bad Lands Broadcasting	Rapid City	Newell

=== Television ===
- KOTA-TV 3 ABC (ATSC 7)
- KEVN-LD 7 Fox (ATSC 23)
- KBHE-TV 9 PBS (ATSC 26)
- KCLO-TV 15 The CW Plus, 15.2 MyNetworkTV, 15.3 Ion Television (ATSC 16)
- KNBN 21 NBC, 21.2 CBS (ATSC 22)
- KHME 23 MeTV (ATSC 2)
- KRPC-LP 33 Heartland (ATSC 33)

=== Print ===
- Black Hills Visitor Magazine (since 1984)
- Black Hills Bride
- Black Hills Parent
- Rapid City Journal
- Rapid City Post
- Patriot (Ellsworth AFB Bulletin)

== Infrastructure ==
=== Transportation ===
==== Public Transit ====
Rapid City is served by Rapid City Rapid Ride, which provides fixed route and demand response service to the region.

Rapid City has a municipally owned bus service, providing multiple bus stops and a headquarters in the city. It has limited city-to-city bus service along I-90. Charter bus services operate in the area, connecting Rapid City and Deadwood with cities in Colorado, Nebraska, and Iowa.

Intercity bus service to the city is provided by Jefferson Lines.

==== Roads ====
- Interstate 90
- Interstate 190
- US Highway 16
- South Dakota Highway 44
- South Dakota Highway 79

==== Air ====
Rapid City Regional Airport provides flights to the airline hub cities, and has general aviation operations, including wildfire fighting activities, and medical flight support to Rapid City medical facilities and regional Indian Health Service operations.

==== Railroads ====
Historically, Rapid City was primarily served by two railroads: the Chicago & North Western Railway and the Milwaukee Road. Following extensive restructuring in the industry in the late 20th and early 21st centuries, the city is now served only by the Rapid City, Pierre and Eastern Railroad (RCP&E). Rapid City has no passenger train service, and was last served in 1960 by the C&NW's Dakota 400, a daily train from Chicago to Rapid City via Rochester.

=== Power ===
Rapid City is located on the boundary of the Western and Eastern power grids. It is served by the hydroelectric plants of the two Mainstem dams on the Missouri River, and the large coal fields and power plants of the Powder River Basin of Wyoming. It is located where the two national power grids connect with each other, allowing switching of electrical power from east to west and vice versa. Rapid City had its own coal-fired power plant but could not afford to meet current air pollution standards and closed it. Closed for similar reasons were coal-fired power stations near Gillette, Wyoming. The Ben French power station located within city boundaries shut down September 2012, more than two years ahead of its scheduled shutdown. Rapid City now obtains much of its power from the Missouri dams and importing it from elsewhere. Following the shut down of the plants dependent on coal, electrical rates have increased. The city has had to spend more to import electricity over a longer distance.

=== Water ===
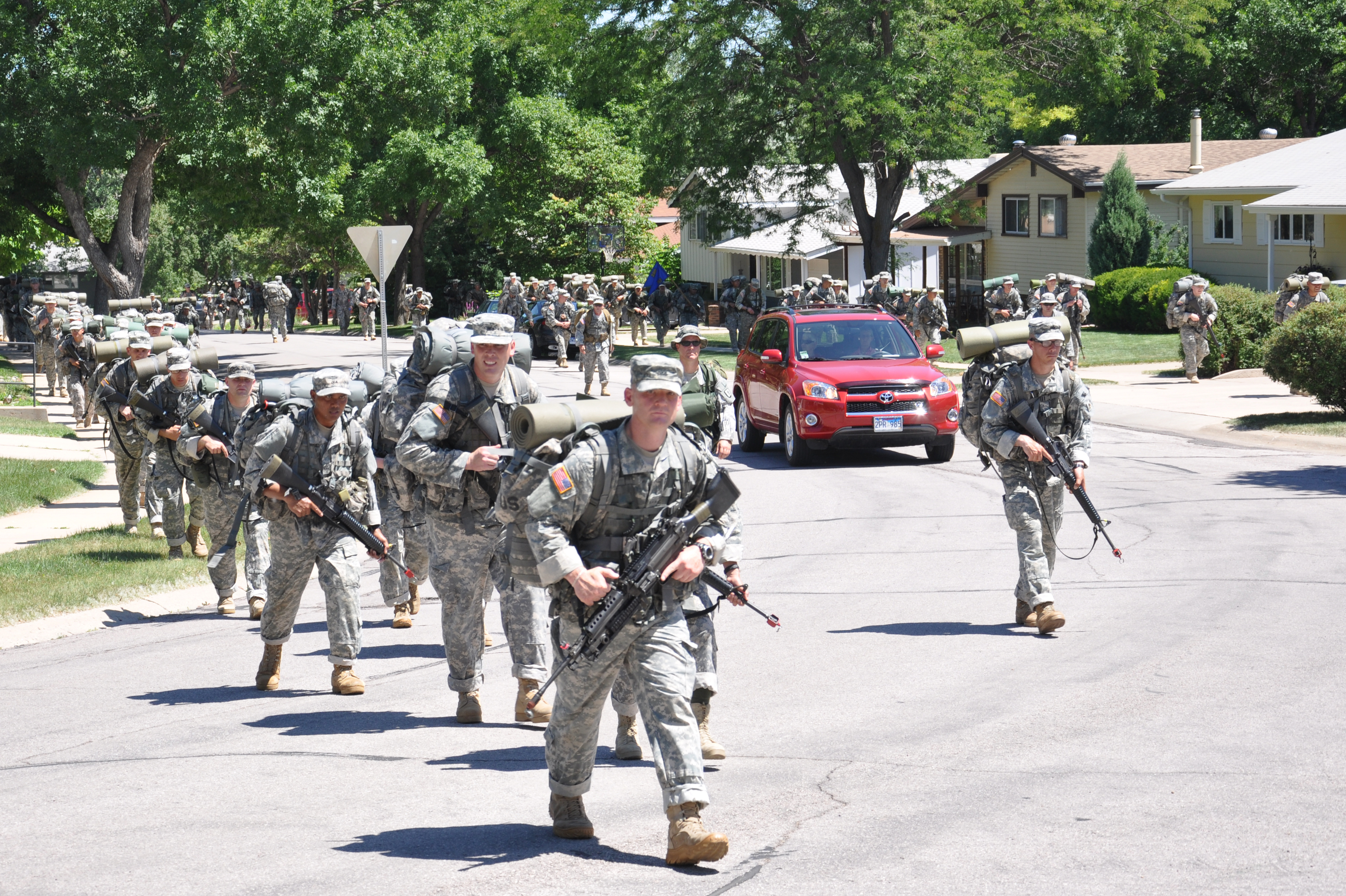
National Guard officer candidates take part in a tactical road march through a west Rapid City neighborhood.

Rapid City obtains most of its water supply from Rapid Creek and the alluvial aquifers associated with the creek, owning significant water rights in Pactola Reservoir located some 15 miles (24 km) west of the city, but does also obtain water from some springs in the vicinity, and has the ability to draw water from deep formations that receive water from recharge in areas of the Black Hills where the formations come to the surface. The heavy dependence on shallow alluvial aquifers is of some concern to planners, as most suburbs of Rapid City use septic systems for domestic sewage treatment. However, water supplies remain relatively good for future growth.

=== Healthcare ===
Hospitals include:

- Monument Health Rapid City Hospital, a level 2 Trauma Center, and the busiest emergency department in South Dakota with 57,000 visits annually.
- Black Hills Surgical Hospital
- Indian Health Service’s Oyate Health Center provides care to the Native American community

=== Emergency services ===
Emergency medical services are provided by the Rapid City Fire Department. Emergency medical transportation by rotor and fixed wing aircraft is provided by Black Hills Life Flight, and MARC (Medical Air Rescue Company).

== Sister cities ==
Rapid City has three sister cities, as designated by Sister Cities International:

- Apolda, Thuringia, Germany
- Nikkō, Tochigi, Japan
