= Eldon L. Smith =

American politician

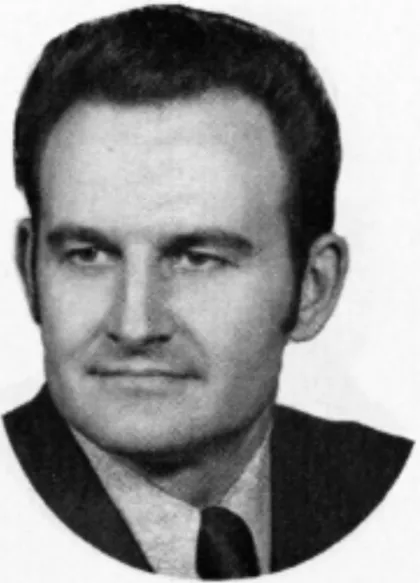
- Smith in 1971

Member of the South Dakota Senate
- In office 1971–1972
- Succeeded by: Jacob Kunstle

Personal details
- Born: February 11, 1928
- Died: June 9, 1972 (aged 44)
- Party: Republican
- Education: South Dakota State University; Black Hills State College

Eldon L. Smith (February 11, 1928 – June 9, 1972) was an American politician. He served as a Republican member of the South Dakota Senate.

== Life and career ==
Smith attended South Dakota State University and Black Hills State College.

Smith served in the South Dakota Senate from 1971 to 1972.

Smith died in June 1972 during the Rapid City Flood.
