= Pfrondorf =

Area of Tübingen, Baden-Württemberg, Germany

Coordinates: 48°32′55″N 9°06′45″E

Pfrondorf is part of the city of Tübingen and the district of Tübingen within the state of Baden-Württemberg in Germany. It is located just at the north-eastern edge of the city, about 6 km (3.7 mi) from the city centre. It lies at the edge of the Schönbuch nature park on a hill.

Pfrondorf lies 424m above sea level. It has 3,300 inhabitants (2005 est.).
