= Rapid City Rapid Ride =

Mass transportation service

Rapid Ride
- Headquarters: 300 Sixth Street
- Locale: Rapid City, SD
- Service type: bus service, paratransit
- Routes: 6
- Website: rapidride.org

Rapid City Rapid Ride is the provider of mass transportation in the City of Rapid City, Pennington County, South Dakota providing fixed route bus service since 1992. Six scheduled bus routes operate Monday through Saturday at 30 minutes intervals. Dial-A-Ride provides ADA paratransit service for qualified customers. City View Trolley is a replica trolley service.

== Regular bus routes ==
- Borglum
- Jefferson
- Lincoln
- Roosevelt
- Washington
- Coolidge

Each route starts and ends at the Milo Barber Transportation Center near 6th and Omaha in downtown Rapid City, and consists of two different laps. All the routes except Coolidge start on the half-hour.

== Milo Barber Transportation Center ==
The Milo Barber Transportation Center, located at 333 6th Street, serves as the primary hub for Rapid Ride, as well as an intercity bus stop for Jefferson Lines. The facility was constructed in 1980 and reopened after renovations on May 26, 2011.

== Fixed Route Ridership ==
The ridership and service statistics shown here are of fixed route services only and do not include demand response. Per capita statistics are based on the Rapid City urbanized area as reported in NTD data. The reduction in per capita ridership from 2010 to 2011 is a result of the 2010 census numbers replacing the 2000 census numbers.

| | Ridership | Change | Ridership per capita |
|---|---|---|---|
| 2002 | 109,987 | n/a | 1.65 |
| 2005 | 174,947 | n/a | 2.62 |
| 2006 | 192,422 | ▲9.99% | 2.88 |
| 2007 | 217,540 | ▲13.05% | 3.26 |
| 2008 | 250,522 | ▲15.16% | 3.75 |
| 2009 | 232,179 | ▼7.32% | 3.48 |
| 2010 | 256,196 | ▲10.34% | 3.84 |
| 2011 | 310,121 | ▲21.05% | 3.82 |
| 2013 | 304,599 | n/a | 3.75 |
| 2014 | 287,623 | ▼5.57% | 3.54 |
| 2015 | 291,026 | ▲1.18% | 3.58 |
| 2016 | 295,060 | ▲1.39% | 3.63 |
| 2017 | 348,210 | ▲18.01% | 4.29 |
| 2018 | 369,697 | ▲6.17% | 4.55 |
| 2019 | 418,085 | ▲13.09% | 5.15 |
| 2020 | 213,004 | ▼49.05% | 2.62 |
| 2021 | 162,083 | ▼23.91% | 1.99 |

== See also ==
- List of bus transit systems in the United States
- Sioux Area Metro
- YST Transit
