= 1972 Black Hills flood =

1972 severe flooding in the Rapid City metropolitan area, South Dakota, USA

Coordinates: 44°03′28″N 103°17′13″W

Black Hills flood of 1972
Meteorological history
- Duration: June 9–10, 1972

Overall effects
- Fatalities: 238
- Damage: $165 million (1972 USD)
- Areas affected: Rapid City, South Dakota area

The Black Hills Flood of 1972, also known as the Rapid City Flood, was the most detrimental flood in South Dakota history, and one of the deadliest floods in U.S. history. The flood took place on June 9–10, 1972 in the Black Hills of Western South Dakota. Rapid Creek and other waterways flooded due to 15 inches (380 mm) of rain in a small area over the eastern Black Hills.

Severe flooding through the Black Hills resulted in 238 deaths and total damages of $165 million USD ($1.23 billion in 2025 dollars). The majority of the loss of life and damage occurred in Rapid City, where business and houses had been constructed in the Rapid Creek floodplain. In the aftermath of the flood, new zoning codes and floodway designations resulted in a redevelopment of the floodplain as mainly parks and recreation spaces to prevent future loss of life.

== Background ==
In 1972, Rapid City had a population of approximately 43,000 people. Rapid Creek flows through the center of the city, and by the 1970s much of the floodplain had been developed for housing and business. As the city grew through the 1900s, dams on Rapid Creek were built for irrigation, drinking water supply, and recreation, including Canyon Lake Dam in 1938 and Pactola Dam in 1956.

== Precipitation event ==
In the week leading up to the flood, smaller rain events were recorded at Pactola Dam, including 2.49 inches on June 5th. By June 9th, the soils were likely still saturated, which would have increased the amount of runoff.

On June 9th, the orographic lifting ability of the Hills enabled an easterly bringing moist air to rise and contribute water to a long series of convective cell thunderstorms, which dropped heavy showers on the eastern Black Hills. The maximum recorded rainfall for the storm, taken at Nemo, SD, was 15 inches in just over six hours. This was estimated at 90% of the probable maximum precipitation (PMP), which is the maximum amount of precipitation possible in an area given perfect meteorological factors.

Due to unusually light winds at higher elevations, the storms remained almost stationary over the eastern slopes of the Black Hills from about 6 pm on June 9th to 2 am on June 10th. A mesoscale cloud mass moving in from northeastern Colorado contributed moisture and increased the vertical motion of the system, likely amplifying the impacts of the storm.

Cloud seeding experiments being conducted by the Institute of Atmospheric Sciences on clouds west of Rapid City were speculated to have contributed to the unusual amount of rain. However, there is no evidence that the two phenomena were related.

== Flooding ==
The intense rain, combined with the already saturated soils in the upper watershed, resulted in a huge amount of runoff. As rain continued throughout the evening of June 9th, flash flood warnings were radioed throughout the eastern Black Hills, with the Rapid City mayor issuing an evacuation order for low-lying areas at 10:30 pm.

Canyon Lake Dam, an earth-fill dam constructed in 1938, was located 7 miles upstream of Rapid City on Rapid Creek. During the flood, the dam accumulated severe debris on the emergency spillway as the rainfall continued. Despite attempts to clear the obstructions, the spillway remained inoperable, and water overtopped the dam crest. The dam failed at 10:45 pm on June 9th. However, the dam failure did not significantly contribute to the flood peak, likely because the dam did not give way suddenly.

Of the 371 sq. mi. of the Rapid Creek watershed, only about 51 sq. mi. downstream of Pactola Dam contributed to the flooding at Rapid City, due less rainfall in the upper watershed and the flood control impacts of the dam. The peak flow in Rapid Creek at Rapid City was estimate at 50,000 cubic feet per second. However, due to the short duration of flow (Rapid Creek was no longer inundating the floodplain by 5 am on June 10th), the volume of flow only about 13,000 acre-ft over the two-day period.

Flooding was also observed on other local streams, including Boxelder Creek, Battle Creek, Elk Creek, and Bear Butte Creek.

== Victims and damage ==
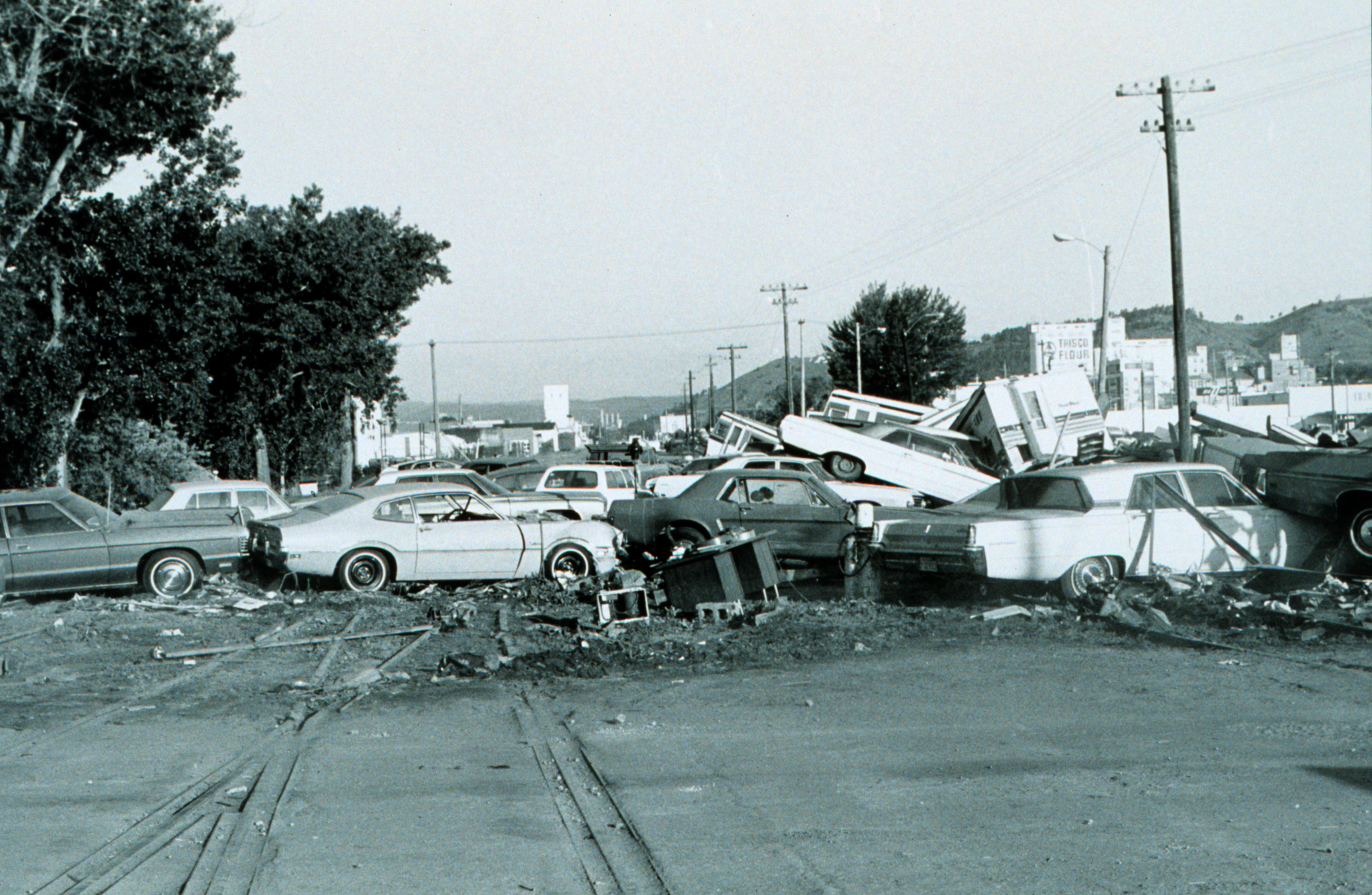
Cars jumbled together by the flood

Throughout the region, the flood caused a large amount of damage, but the most severe of the impacts were in Rapid City, where 230 of the 238 casualties occurred. The other eight victims were from Keystone, South Dakota, when severe flooding from Battle Creek inundated the town. Among the victims were Eldon L. Smith, a South Dakota state senator, and a disproportionate number of Native Americans living in Rapid City.

In addition to the lives lost, the flood caused widespread economic damage. Flood waters displaced large rocks, trees, trailers, and vehicles, and carried homes away. A total of 1,335 homes were destroyed or rendered uninhabitable, and 2,820 homes were damaged, with 200 businesses damaged and over 5,000 cars destroyed. The total cost of the 1972 Black Hills flood totaled $165 million, including infrastructure and utilities.

== Aftermath ==
Though evacuation orders and flash-flood warnings were determined to have saved many lives, the National Weather Service office at Rapid City lacked communication equipment to receive urgent radar updates and severe weather alerts at the time of the flood. Since the flood, additional real-time monitoring stations have been installed on local streams in order to better inform forecasters and residents about stream rise.

Before the flood, Rapid City had already begun to implement floodplain management policies. In the aftermath, additional programs were developed to prevent future loss of life. A floodway was designated through the center of the floodplain, a levee was constructed to protect local businesses, and the floodplain was rezoned to prevent the construction of houses and motels. The majority of the flood plain was redeveloped as green-space. Canyon Lake Dam was reconstructed to allow passage of a flood of the size of the 1972 event.
