= National Register of Historic Places listings in Walworth County, South Dakota =

Location of Walworth County in South Dakota

This is a list of the National Register of Historic Places listings in Walworth County, South Dakota.

This is intended to be a complete list of the properties on the National Register of Historic Places in Walworth County, South Dakota, United States. The locations of National Register properties for which the latitude and longitude coordinates are included below, may be seen in a map.

There are 13 properties listed on the National Register in the county.

This National Park Service list is complete through NPS recent listings posted March 14, 2025.

== Current listings ==
| | Name on the Register | Image | Date listed | Location | City or town | Description |
|---|---|---|---|---|---|---|
| 1 | Brown Palace Hotel | Brown Palace Hotel | January 27, 1983 (#83003022) | 301 Main St. 45°32′08″N 100°26′02″W | Mobridge | |
| 2 | A. H. Brown Public Library | A. H. Brown Public Library | December 22, 1978 (#78002573) | N. Main St. 45°32′17″N 100°26′02″W | Mobridge | |
| 3 | Brown-Evans House | | June 21, 1990 (#90000960) | 405 1st Ave., W. 45°32′12″N 100°26′07″W | Mobridge | |
| 4 | Gravel Pit Site (39WW203) | Gravel Pit Site (39WW203) | April 3, 1986 (#86000834) | Address Restricted | Mobridge | |
| 5 | Java Depot | | June 6, 2001 (#01000640) | Northwestern corner of Railway Ave. and Main St. 45°30′17″N 99°53′12″W | Java | |
| 6 | Johnson Barn | | August 30, 2005 (#05000950) | Approximately 4 miles west-northwest of Glenham; 45°32′55″N 100°21′36″W | Mobridge | |
| 7 | Mobridge Auditorium | Mobridge Auditorium | May 23, 1986 (#86001189) | 212 Main St. 45°32′10″N 100°25′58″W | Mobridge | |
| 8 | Mobridge Masonic Temple | Mobridge Masonic Temple | March 25, 1977 (#77001259) | 6th and Main Sts. 45°32′17″N 100°26′00″W | Mobridge | |
| 9 | Molstad Lake Park | | November 29, 2010 (#10000953) | 1¾ miles north of U.S. Route 12 on 293rd Ave. 45°33′38″N 100°18′20″W | Glenham | |
| 10 | Wilhelm Moser House-Barn | | November 28, 1984 (#84001299) | North of Java in the middle of the western half of Section 6, T124, R74W; 45°35′13″N 99°49′37″W | Java | |
| 11 | Jacob Ochszbner Sr. House | | August 13, 1984 (#84003421) | North of Java in the southern half of Section 18, T124N, R75W; 45°33′07″N 99°56′38″W | Java | |
| 12 | Selby Opera House | Selby Opera House | September 25, 1987 (#87001730) | 3409 Main St. 45°30′23″N 100°01′06″W | Selby | |
| 13 | Walworth County Courthouse | Walworth County Courthouse | June 3, 1999 (#99000680) | 4304 4th Ave. 45°30′25″N 100°02′03″W | Selby | |

== See also ==
- List of National Historic Landmarks in South Dakota
- National Register of Historic Places listings in South Dakota
