= KCCR =

KCCR can refer to:

- KCCR (AM), a radio station at 1240 AM located in Pierre, South Dakota
- KCCR-FM, a radio station at 104.5 FM located in Blunt, South Dakota
- The ICAO code for Buchanan Field Airport
- KCCR, a research facility in Kumasi, Ghana
