= KOLY =

KOLY may refer to:

- KOLY (AM), a radio station (1300 AM) licensed to Mobridge, South Dakota, United States
- KOLY-FM, a radio station (99.5 FM) licensed to Mobridge, South Dakota, United States
