= KGFX =

KGFX may refer to:

- KGFX (AM), a radio station (1060 AM) licensed to Pierre, South Dakota, United States
- KGFX-FM, a radio station (92.7 FM) licensed to Pierre, South Dakota, United States
