= Ida McNeil =

American broadcaster (1888–1974)

- Born: Ida Anding; September 8, 1888; Winona, Minnesota, U.S.
- Died: August 13, 1974 (aged 85); Pierre, South Dakota, U.S.
- Occupation: Broadcaster
- Years active: 1922–1962
- Known for: KGFX founder and broadcaster; Designer of the first flag of South Dakota
- Spouse: Dana McNeil (m. 1921; died 1936)
- Awards: Golden Mike Award (1956); South Dakota Hall of Fame (1978)

Ida McNeil (née Anding; September 8, 1888 – August 13, 1974) was an American broadcaster and the designer of the first state flag of South Dakota. She and her husband, Dana McNeil, founded KGFX, in Pierre, South Dakota, one of the first radio stations in South Dakota, in 1927. She continued to run the station after his death in 1936 until her retirement in 1962. She has been nicknamed "Mrs. Pierre" for her work in broadcasting and "the Betsy Ross of South Dakota" for her state flag design.

She received a Golden Mike Award in 1956 for her contributions to community service through broadcasting. She was inducted into the South Dakota Broadcasting Hall of Fame in 1972 and into the South Dakota Hall of Fame in 1978.

== Early life ==
Ida Anding was born on September 8, 1888, in Winona, Minnesota, the eldest of five daughters born to steamboat engineer Herman Anding and his wife. In 1896, the family moved to Pierre, South Dakota, so Herman could work on the local ferry Jim Leighton, which ran between Pierre and Fort Pierre. McNeil graduated from Pierre High School in 1906.

== South Dakota state flag ==
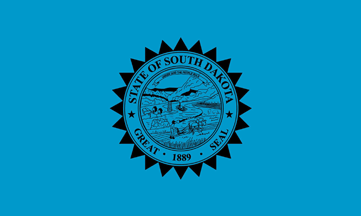
McNeil's state flag design, in use 1909–1963

McNeil's first post-graduation job was with the South Dakota Department of History in Pierre, where she filled a variety of roles. She first worked as a clerk and legislative reference librarian before becoming personal secretary to superintendent Doane Robinson, and later became assistant superintendent.

Robinson was first approached by Ernest May, a state senator representing Deadwood, about South Dakota's lack of state flag. Robinson asked McNeil to design one and requested it incorporate a sun motif to represent the state's sunny weather. McNeil came up with a two-sided blue flag. On one side was an embroidered yellow sun, "South Dakota", and "The Sunshine State"; on the other side was the state seal. Her design was accepted by the state legislature in 1909 and used unaltered until the 1950s, when the reverse side was dropped. McNeil later stated that she wished she had left the reverse side blank in her original design, having not realized at the time how difficult and expensive it was to produce a two-sided flag. Because of its difficult design, McNeil continued to reproduce the flags by hand for several decades.

In a 1941 feature on South Dakota, Life magazine referred to McNeil as "South Dakota's 'Betsy Ross'".

== Broadcasting career ==
Ida resigned from the Department of History in 1921 to marry Dana McNeil. An amateur broadcaster who dabbled in ham radio and telegraphy, Dana had obtained his first amateur radio license on June 6, 1916, under the call sign 9ZP. All amateur licenses were canceled during World War I, and in 1922, Dana secured a standard amateur license for station 9CLS.

As Dana worked long hours as a conductor for the Chicago and North Western Transportation Company on the line between Pierre and Rapid City, Ida began regular transmissions to keep him company and to relay the local weather and news. Dana also taught Ida Morse code. Over the next few years, other locals began tuning into Ida's transmissions. In response, Ida developed a standard news program.

The McNeils secured a license for a new 200-watt broadcasting station, with the randomly assigned call letters KGFX, on August 15, 1927, and officially launched it to the public. At this time there were over 600 broadcasting stations in the United States, including eight others in South Dakota, all on the AM band, as FM and TV stations did not exist until the 1940s.

The McNeils broadcast from their house for the entire time they ran the station. Their first residence was at 504 West Pleasant Drive, but in 1923, they relocated to 203 West Summit Avenue. The transmitter was set up in the garage, and the dining room hosted the recording studio. After Dana's death in 1936, Ida continued to run the station by herself, aided only at times by a chief engineer and her son.

McNeil tailored her programming specifically for her listeners' needs, focusing on local events, gossip, public service announcements, and calls to action. This notably included her "Hospital News" segment, during which she relayed the health of patients staying at the state hospital—St. Mary's—in Pierre. McNeil gathered information by calling the hospital every morning and would relay births, admissions, patient statuses, and deaths. McNeil also passed along messages and errand requests between family members and friends. At times, during severe weather such as blizzards, KGFX was the only connection to the outside world for locals. During a time when rural road conditions were poor and the telephone was not yet widespread, McNeil's broadcasts kept the broadly-spread community connected.

In 1932, McNeil became one of the first broadcasters in the United States to begin selling commercial time on radio; however, she still reserved 70% of air time for news. After the weather service in Pierre shut down between 1935 and 1942, McNeil began broadcasting it instead. In 1946, McNeil was elected chairman of the South Dakota Broadcasters organization. By 1947, her listener audience was estimated to be about 221,000.

Her dedication to reporting not just news but also daily life earned her the moniker "Mrs. Pierre". During her entire time on air, McNeil announced her name only once, during a broadcast on her 50th anniversary.

In 1962, McNeil sold KGFX to the Black Hills Broadcasting Company and retired from broadcasting, moving to Rapid City.

== Personal life ==
Ida married Dana McNeil in November 1921; Dana was a widower and Ida was his second wife. He died in 1936. They had two sons, Robert and Richard.

== Death ==
McNeil died on August 13, 1974, in a hospital in Rapid City. She was buried in Pierre.

== Awards and honors ==
McNeil received a Golden Mike Award in 1956 for her contributions to community service through broadcasting. She accepted the award during a ceremony in St. Louis, Missouri, in April 1957.

On July 19, 1962, U.S. senator from South Dakota Karl Mundt delivered a speech to the United States Senate, and entered into the record a series of news items commemorating McNeil's contributions to broadcasting in their home state. Mundt remarked, "Ida and KGFX became a family institution for many in central South Dakota, a radio outlet upon which the public could depend for public service to the fullest degree".

She was inducted into the South Dakota Broadcasting Hall of Fame in 1972—the second woman to receive that honor—and to the South Dakota Hall of Fame in 1978.
