= St. Charles Hotel =

St. Charles Hotel may signify:

- St. Charles Hotel (Los Angeles), originally called the Bella Union Hotel
- St. Charles Hotel (Pierre, South Dakota)
- St. Charles Hotel, New Orleans
- Rector Hotel (Seattle, Washington), known as the St. Charles Hotel from 1917 to 1931.
