= KPLO =

KPLO may refer to:

- KPLO-TV, a television station (channel 13 digital) licensed to Reliance, South Dakota, United States, rebroadcasting KELO-TV
- KPLO-FM, a radio station (94.5 FM) licensed to Reliance, South Dakota, United States
- Korea Pathfinder Lunar Orbiter, also called Danuri, the first lunar exploration mission by the Korea Aerospace Research Institute.
