= Southern flag =

Southern flag may refer to:

- Flag of South Africa
- Flag of South Carolina
- Flag of South Dakota
- Flag of South Korea
- Flag of South Sudan
- Flag of South Vietnam
- Flag of the Confederate States of America
