= Brown Palace Hotel =

Brown Palace Hotel may refer to:

- Brown Palace Hotel (Denver, Colorado)
- Brown Palace Hotel (Mobridge, South Dakota)
