= KGFX (AM) =

- Pierre, South Dakota; United States
- Frequency: 1060 kHz
- Branding: 1060 KGFX

Programming
- Format: Classic country
- Affiliations: ABC News Radio; Minnesota Twins

Ownership
- Owner: Ingstad Family Media; (James River Broadcasting Company)
- Sister stations: KGFX-FM; KJBI; KMLO; KOLY; KOLY-FM; KPLO-FM

History
- First air date: 1927 as KGFX (began regular transmissions as 9CLS in 1922)

Technical information
- Licensing authority: FCC
- Facility ID: 30209
- Class: B
- Power: 10,000 watts day; 1,000 watts night
- Transmitter coordinates: 44°17′11.9″N 100°20′19.5″W
- Translator: 103.1 K276GT (Pierre)

Links
- Public license information: Public file; LMS
- Webcast: Listen live
- Website: drgnews.com/kgfx/

KGFX (1060 kHz) is a classic country-formatted commercial AM radio station, located in Pierre, South Dakota and owned by the James River Broadcasting Company.

All four DRG Media Group (James River) stations in Pierre share studios at 214 West Pleasant Drive, and KGFX's transmitter site is located off U.S. Route 83 south of Pierre. The station operates with 10,000 watts during daylight hours, but because AM 1060 is a clear channel frequency with priority reserved for Class A stations KYW in Philadelphia and XECPAE in Mexico City, KGFX must reduce power at night to 1,000 watts. Programming can also be heard on K276GT, an FM translator station at 103.1 MHz.

KGFX's initial grant as a broadcasting station occurred in 1927. However, the station traces its pre-history to a 1916 amateur radio station; this gives the station one of radio's longest historical records.

== History ==
=== Amateur station predecessors ===
Although KGFX was not licensed as a broadcasting station until August 1927, by this time the owner, Dana McNeil, and his wife, the former Ida Anding, already had extensive radio experience. KGFX has commonly dated its history back to June 6, 1916, when Dana McNeil was issued a license for Special Amateur station 9ZP. As was true with virtually all amateur stations of this era, 9ZP was equipped with a spark-gap transmitter which was only capable of transmitting the dots-and-dashes of Morse code. Moreover, it was required to shut down in April 1917, when all civilian radio stations were ordered off the air due to the United States entering into World War One. During the war, important vacuum-tube transmitter improvements were perfected that made audio transmissions practical.

Dana and Ida were married in 1921, and the next year Dana McNeil was relicensed for a standard amateur station, 9CLS, located at 152 Pleasant Drive. McNeil was a Chicago & North Western Railway train conductor who worked the Pierre-Rapid City run. Ida learned how to operate the amateur station equipment, and began to use it to transmit regular reports to her husband when he was away from home. In 1923, 9CLS underwent a major upgrade, which included installation of a 100-watt vacuum-tube transmitter.

Pierre was located in a sparsely settled region of central South Dakota, with few of the outlying ranches having telephones or electrical service, and communication was severely limited. As knowledge of Ida's radioed weather and news reports to her husband spread, numerous persons in the region began to depend on these transmissions for up-to-date information. 1923 saw the introduction of one of the station's most popular features, when, at the request of one of the listeners, Ida began providing status reports for patients at the local hospital, Saint Mary's.

In 1924 Ida's transmissions received national publicity, via a wire-service article carried in numerous newspapers, which reported that she maintained a regular schedule of twice-daily 30-minute transmissions, at 12:15 and 6:00 p.m., made on alternate days when her husband was traveling along his railroad route.

=== KGFX ===
Amateur radio stations were supposed to refrain from transmissions intended for the general public. On August 15, 1927, Dana McNeil was issued a broadcasting station license with the randomly assigned call letters KGFX, for operation on 1180 kHz with 200 watts from the family home at 510 Summit Avenue in Pierre. This grant specified operating hours of 6 a.m. to 6 p.m. On November 11, 1928, as part of a major reallocation resulting from the Federal Radio Commission's General Order 40, the station's frequency was changed to 580 kHz, daytime-only.

In 1930 the National Weather Bureau closed its Pierre data-collecting station, after which KGFX personnel volunteered to assume responsibility for collecting the local weather information, which was considered vital for area ranchers. Every six hours, around the clock, they launched weather balloons and weather-measuring equipment to record information reported to the Weather Bureau and also broadcast over KGFX. Although Pierre is South Dakota's capital, until KCCR was licensed in 1959, KGFX was the city's only radio station, and it became known as a local institution. The station carried legion baseball games beginning in 1934, as well as numerous live broadcasts of official government proceedings. Ida McNeil generally worked as the station's sole announcer, but because she almost never mentioned her name on the air, she became known by most listeners only as "Mrs. Pierre".

KGFX 90 Year Anniversary Logo from 2006

Logo before translator sign on

In May 1931, Dana McNeil applied to move the station to Aberdeen under the control of Equity Union Creameries, but the move was not approved. (Station WNAX in Yankton opposed the transfer, and also reported that KGFX was currently broadcasting "less than an hour a day".) In 1932 KGFX's transmitting frequency was changed to 630 kHz., in order to allow WNAX, operating on 570 kHz, to increase power without causing mutual interference. KGFX's 630 kHz assignment was limited to daytime-only operation, with a further reduced "specified hours" schedule of 9:30 a.m. to local sunset. Previously commercial free, that same year the station began soliciting and selling advertising time.

Dana McNeil retired from the railroad in 1935 and died on October 15 of the next year at the age of 71, leaving the station's ownership and operation to Ida. Around this time the family, including the radio studio, moved to 203 West Summit (later renamed Broadway Avenue).

In 1956, KGFX celebrated its 40th anniversary. A review noted that an engineer was the station's only other full-time employee, so in addition to being the owner, Ida McNeil was KGFX's "operator, business manager, newscaster, program director, and advertising solicitor" and was "on the air eight hours a day and spends another six hours or so on paperwork. It's rugged, she admits." In 1957, Ida McNeil received one of the seven "Mike" awards given that year by McCall's magazine in recognition of women in broadcasting.

In 1962 Ida NcNeil, now 74 years old, decided to retire, and sold KGFX to Black Hills Radio, Inc. At the time of the sale the station was still operating with a limited "specified hours" schedule and 200 watts, and the new owners began to make significant upgrades. The hours of operation were expanded to the full available daytime hours, and in 1967 the station moved to 1060 kHz, now operating with 10,000 watts although still limited to daytime-only broadcasts, from a two tower directional-antenna site constructed south of Fort Pierre along U.S. Route 83. In 1976 two additional towers were constructed, which allowed the station to add a nighttime service with 1,000 watts.

The studio remained in the McNeil house at 203 West Broadway Avenue until 1967, when it moved to the Sahr Building, at the corner of East Capital and Highland Streets. In 1972 James River Broadcasting moved the studio to 214 West Pleasant Drive.
