= Flag of South Dakota =

U.S. state flag

South Dakota
- Use: Civil and state flag
- Proportion: 3:5
- Adopted: November 9, 1909 (original); March 11, 1963 (first redesign); November 9, 1992; 34 years ago (current)
- Design: A sky blue field with a version (in navy blue on white) of the state seal in the center, surrounded by gold triangles representing the sun's rays, surrounded in turn by inscriptions in gold sans-serif capitals of "south dakota" on top and "the mount rushmore state" (the state nickname) on the bottom.

The current flag of South Dakota was adopted in 1992 to represent the U.S. state of South Dakota. It consists of a field of sky blue charged with a version (in navy blue on white) of the state seal in the center, surrounded by gold triangles representing the sun's rays, surrounded in turn by inscriptions in gold sans-serif capitals of "south dakota" on top and "the mount rushmore state" (the state nickname) on the bottom. The sun represents the common weather in South Dakota.

The first state flag was designed and adopted in 1909. This original flag was bi-faced, with a sun motif on one side and the state seal on the other. A redesign in 1963 embedded the state seal inside the original flag's sun motif. The inscription on the bottom was "the sunshine state" before it was changed in 1992.

== Statute ==
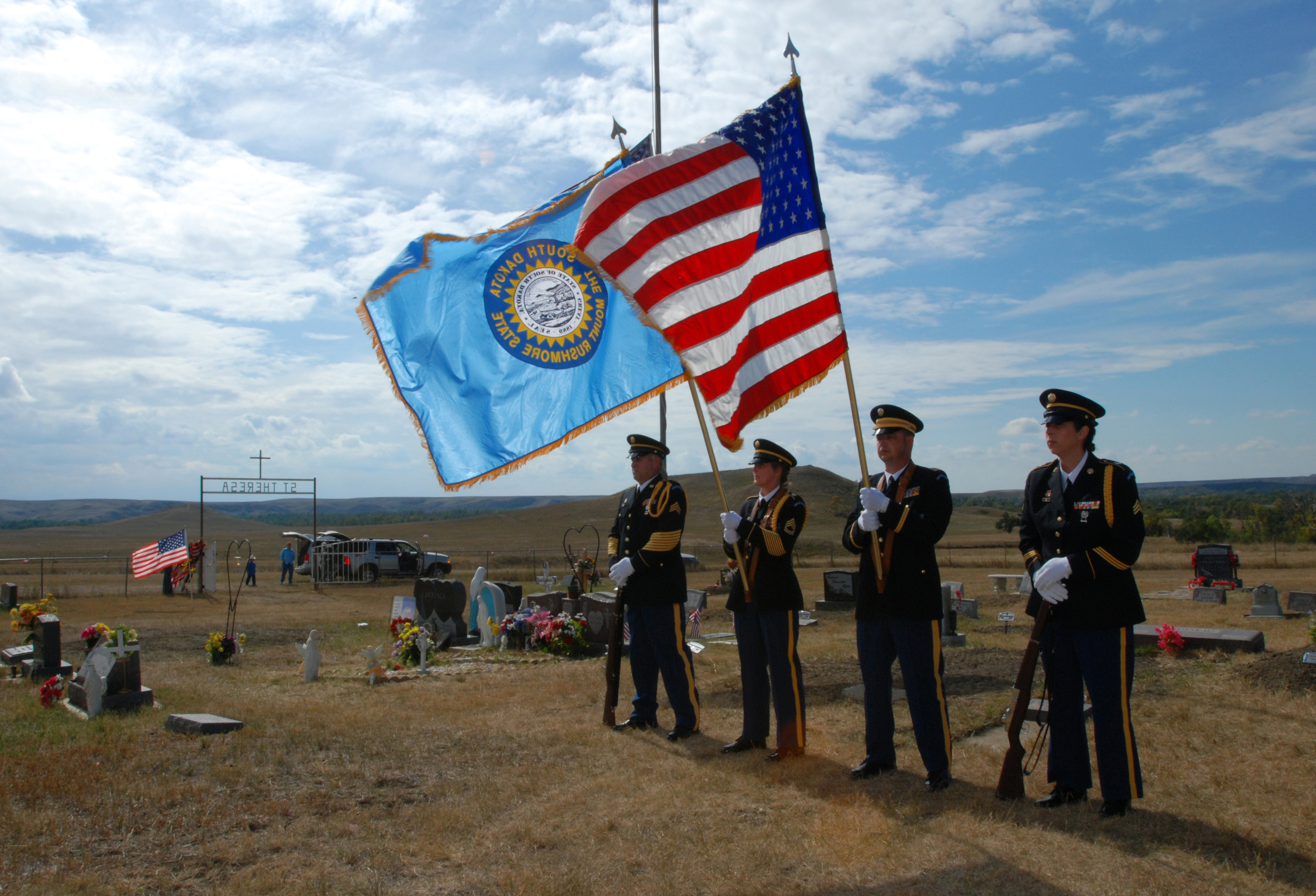
The South Dakota Army National Guard with the state flag.

The 2025 South Dakota Codified Laws, Title 1, Chapter 6, § 1-6-4, defines the state flag as follows:

...a field of sky-blue one and two-thirds as long as it is wide.

Centered on such field shall be the great seal of South Dakota made in conformity with the terms of the Constitution, which shall be four-ninths the width of the flag in diameter. The seal shall be on a white background with the seal outlined in dark blue or, in the alternative, shall be on a sky-blue background with the seal outlined in dark blue thereon.

Surrounding the seal in gold shall be a serrated sun whose extreme width shall be five-ninths the width of the flag.

The words "South Dakota" symmetrically arranged to conform to the circle of the sun and seal shall appear in gold letters one-eighteenth the width of the field above the sun and seal and the words "The Mount Rushmore State" in like-sized gold letters and in like arrangement shall appear below the sun and seal.

Flags designed of such material as may be provident for outdoor use need have no fringe but flags for indoor and display usage shall have a golden fringe one-eighteenth the width of the flag on the three sides other than the hoist.

=== Design of the seal ===
The 2025 South Dakota Codified Laws, Title 1, Chapter 6, § 1-6-2, defines that the state seal shall consist of:

- Circular border: "State of South Dakota" written at top and "Great Seal 1889" at bottom, with stars on either side
- Left foreground: Smelting furnace, hoist house, mill, and dump near a grove on the riverbank
- Left background: Three ranges of hills
- Right foreground: Farmer holding a breaking plow drawn by two horses
- Right background: Pasture with grazing cattle and a field of corn; hills in the distance
- Center: River flowing into the distance with a steamboat; shrubbery on riverbanks
- Top: State motto, "Under God the People Rule"

== History ==
=== Unofficial flag (1883) ===
On June 21, 1883 the people of Huron gathered and came up with the idea of a Dakota state flag. The flags were planned to be raised on July 4, and hang out till the election of that year. They were described as bearing the words: "State of Dakota." In June, Captain Lyons was sailing though Yankton when he flew a state flag from the masthead of his boat. It bore the motto "C. A. Lyons & Co."

=== Original flag (1909) ===
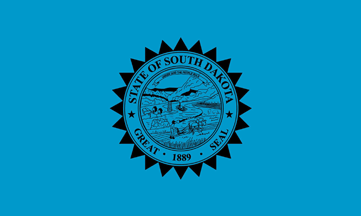
First state flag, 1909–1963

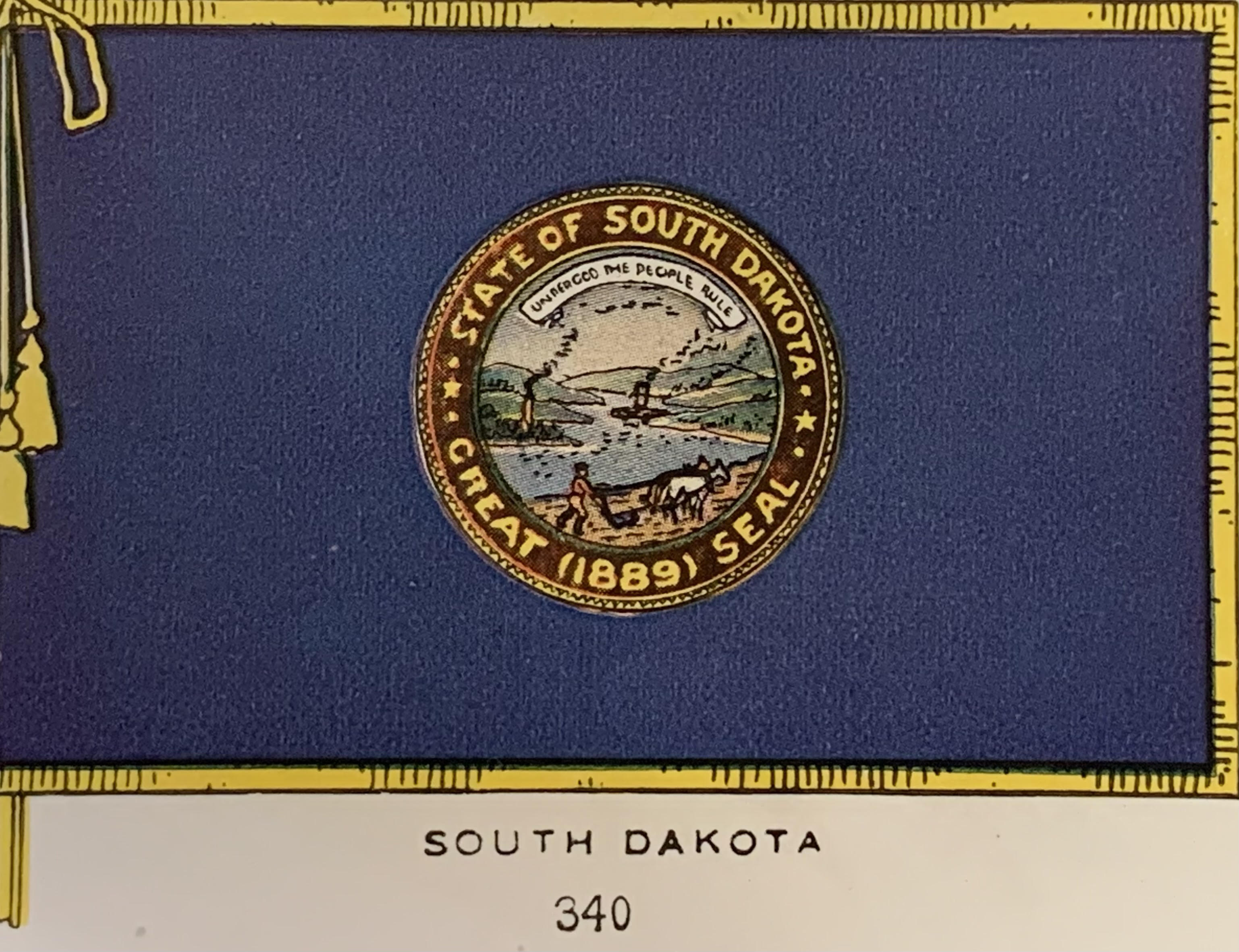
Reverse side of the flag as depicted in National Geographic, 1917

The first flag of South Dakota was designed by Ida McNeil in 1909. Ernest May, a state legislator from Deadwood, approached South Dakota Department of History superintendent Doane Robinson about the lack of a state flag. McNeil was then a legislative reference librarian at the state department. McNeil later recalled that during their meeting, Robinson turned to her and told May, "Miss Anding (Note: Ida McNeil was then known as Ida Anding, as she was not yet married.) will make you a flag".

Seth Bullock, a Deadwood lawman, is sometimes credited as having brought forth the original request for a state flag to May, who in turn brought it to the state department. This claim might have originated from a 1948 edition of The Wi-Iyohi, a monthly bulletin published by the South Dakota State Historical Society. However, South Dakota historians and biographers of Bullock have not uncovered any evidence supporting this claim, and Robinson's 1925 Encyclopedia of South Dakota did not include any mention of Bullock's involvement.

Robinson only requested that the flag include a sun motif, as the state receives a considerable amount of sunshine, and also suggested placing the state seal on the reverse side. This first flag was made from silk upon which McNeil first placed the sun's appliqué and then embroidered its rays. The phrases "south dakota" and "the sunshine state" were embroidered in arcs surrounding the sun. The state seal was then painted on a second piece of silk, which was attached to the back of the first piece to make a two-sided flag.

Senate Bill 208 was introduced and passed on November 9, 1909. It stated:

The Flag of South Dakota shall consist of a field of blue, one and two-thirds as long as it is wide, in the center of which shall be a blazing sun in gold, two-fifths as wide in diameter as the width of the flag. Above this sun shall be arranged in the arc of the circle, in gold letters, the words 'South Dakota' and below this sun in the arc of the circle shall be arranged the words in gold letters, 'The Sunshine State', and on the reverse of the blazing sun shall be printed in dark blue the Great Seal of the State Of South Dakota. The edges of the flag shall be trimmed with a fringe of gold, to be in proportion to the width of the flag. The staff shall be surmounted by a spearhead to which shall be attached cord and tassels of suitable length and size.

The first two flags went to the Secretary of State and Seth Bullock. Bullock's flag is now preserved at the state archives.

In 2015, the original state flag was reported as missing from the South Dakota State Capitol in Pierre. Secretary of State Shantel Krebs, within whose office the flag had been on display, and department employee Theresa Bray initially noted the disappearance on January 2. The capitol conducted internal searches for several weeks but was unable to find the flag. It was then reported to the Legislative Audit office, who then referred it to the South Dakota Attorney General's Office. In October 2015, the flag was recovered in Washington, D.C. from a former state employee, who had removed it from storage in 2013 while repairs were being done to the display.

=== First redesign (1963) ===
Second state flag, 1963–1992

By 1963, the need for a revised flag was evident. The two-sided design was difficult and costly to reproduce—about $75 for materials in 1963 (equivalent to $789 in 2025)—and McNeil recreated the flags upon request for various state organizations. The designs on both sides often showed through to the other.

William Sahr, a state representative from Hughes County, introduced House Bill 503 to redesign the state flag, reducing it down to one side and moving the state seal to inside the sun motif. His design kept the wording from the original. McNeil supported the redesign but was against transposing the state seal onto the front, stating, "Many states use state seals on their flags and if we copy their efforts... we will lose the individuality of our flag". The measure passed and was signed into law on March 11, 1963.

On February 3, 1966, the South Dakota Legislature approved a further measure to create the Special State Flag Account, which set aside funds for the production and purchasing of new flags, and directed the finance department to keep on hand a stock of flags to be distributed as needed.

=== Second redesign (1992) ===
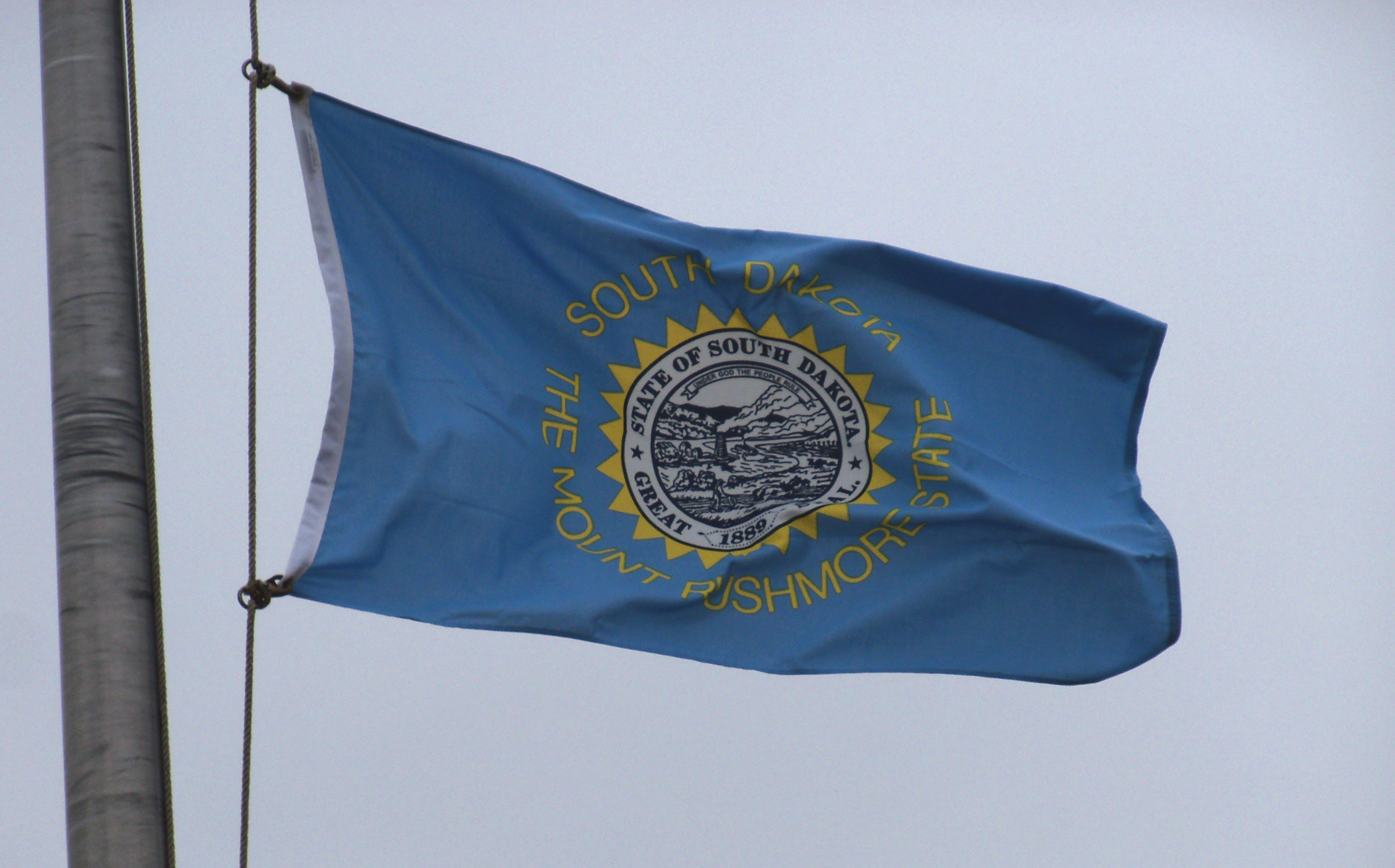
The state flag flying.

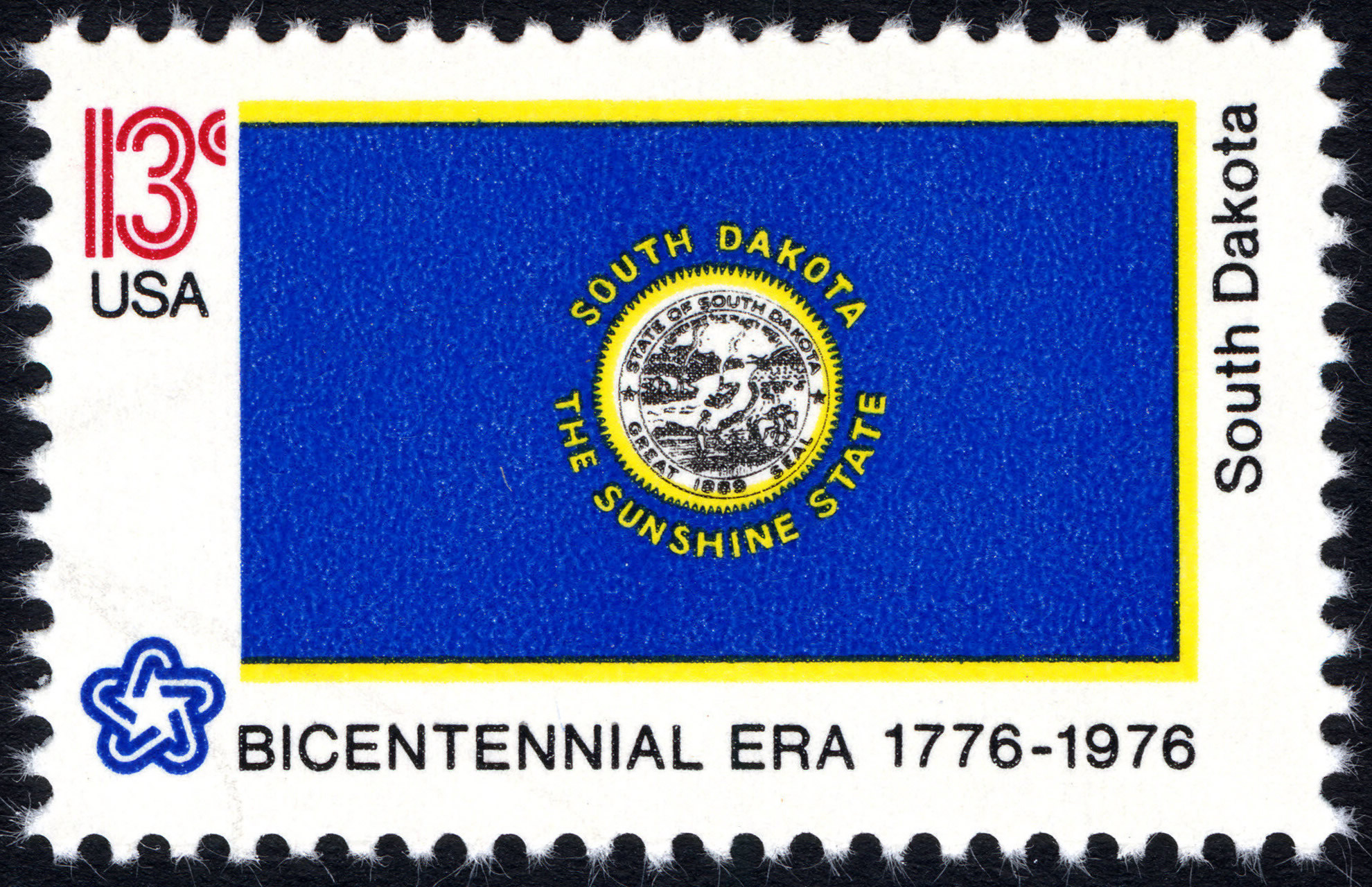
The South Dakota state flag as depicted in the 1976 bicentennial postage stamp series.

Following the adoption of the new state nickname as "the Mount Rushmore state", State Representative Gordon Pederson introduced a new bill to change the wording on the state flag. Although the new design was adopted and remains in use today, the 1963 and 1992 bills both included language that the previous versions of the state flag were still valid to use.

In 2001, vexillologists rated 72 flags representing US states and Canadian provinces and territories. South Dakota’s flag was rated as the fifth worst.

== Flag pledge ==
The official pledge of the South Dakota flag is, "I pledge loyalty and support to the flag and state of South Dakota, land of sunshine, land of infinite variety." The only protocol to the state flag pledge is that it does not either replace or preempt the Pledge of Allegiance to the flag of the United States.

== Redesign proposals ==
=== 2012 ===
Proposed flag of South Dakota from 2012, designed by Dick Termes

In January 2012, Representative Bernie Hunhoff sponsored a bill to adopt a new design for the state flag based on artwork by Dick Termes of Spearfish, South Dakota. Hunhoff introduced the bill on January 25, 2012; it was referred to the State Affairs committee. On February 6, the bill was amended to create the South Dakota State Flag Commission, which would have solicited submissions from the public for new flag designs and selected one to be considered by the 2013 legislature as the new state flag. Immediately after being amended, the bill was "deferred to the 41st legislative day". Since the South Dakota legislative session is only 40 days long, this type of deferral effectively kills legislation.

=== 2024 ===
In January 2024, another bill that would have created a South Dakota state flag design commission was killed in the same manner to the 2012 proposal.

== See also ==
- Symbols of the state of South Dakota
- Seal of South Dakota
