= KLXS-FM =

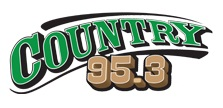
- Pierre, South Dakota; United States
- Frequency: 95.3 MHz
- Branding: Country 95.3

Programming
- Format: Country

Ownership
- Owner: Riverfront Broadcasting LLC
- Sister stations: KCCR-FM KCCR-AM

History
- First air date: 1981 (as KNEY)
- Former call signs: KNEY (1980–1988)

Technical information
- Licensing authority: FCC
- Facility ID: 60860
- Class: C1
- ERP: 100,000 watts
- HAAT: 151 meters (495 feet)
- Transmitter coordinates: 44°18′42″N 100°21′10″W

Links
- Public license information: Public file; LMS
- Website: pierrecountry.com

KLXS-FM (95.3 FM, "Country 95.3") is a radio station licensed to serve Pierre, South Dakota. The station is owned by Riverfront Broadcasting LLC. It airs a country music format.

The station was assigned the KLXS-FM call letters by the Federal Communications Commission on April 29, 1988.

On July 3, 2012 KLXS-FM changed their format from adult hits (as "Jack FM") to country, branded as "Country 95.3".

== History ==
The station's history dates back to 1981 when it first went on the air with the call sign KNEY. It was originally owned and operated by Sorenson Broadcasting for 34 years, alongside its sister station KCCR-AM. The call sign was later changed to KLXS.

In 2006, NRG Media became the station's operator, marking the end of Sorenson Broadcasting's long ownership. However, the ownership under NRG Media was brief. In February 2008, Riverfront Broadcasting LLC, a company owned by Yankton, South Dakota residents Carolyn and Doyle Becker, reached an agreement with NRG Media to purchase KLXS-FM.

The agreement with NRG Media to purchase the station was part of a six station deal.
