= KMLO =

- Lowry, South Dakota; United States
- Broadcast area: Mobridge, South Dakota
- Frequency: 100.7 MHz

Programming
- Format: Country
- Affiliations: ABC News Radio; Minnesota Vikings

Ownership
- Owner: James River Broadcasting Company
- Sister stations: KGFX; KGFX-FM; KJBI; KOLY; KOLY-FM; KPLO-FM

History
- First air date: 1996
- Former call signs: KKFX (1994–1996)
- Call sign meaning: Mobridge sister station to KPLO-FM

Technical information
- Licensing authority: FCC
- Facility ID: 30210
- Class: C1
- ERP: 100,000 watts
- HAAT: 178 meters (584 ft)
- Transmitter coordinates: 45°16′26″N 99°58′22.4″W

Links
- Public license information: Public file; LMS
- Webcast: Listen live
- Website: www.drgnews.com/kmlo/

KMLO (100.7 FM, is a radio station licensed to serve Lowry, South Dakota, United States. The station is owned by James River Broadcasting. It airs a country music format. KMLO is one of the three stations in the Mobridge cluster owned by James River Broadcasting, alongside KOLY and KOLY-FM. The three Mobridge DRG Media Group stations share studios on 3rd St. East, in Mobridge.

The station's first air date was in 1996. Before being assigned the KMLO call letters, the station briefly held the call sign KKFX from 1994 to 1996. The KMLO call sign was assigned by the Federal Communications Commission (FCC) on October 18, 1996. The call letters themselves are thought to be a sister-station tie-in to KPLO-FM in the Pierre market.

== Programming ==
Notable syndicated programming includes CT40 with Fitz on weekends. In addition to its country music programming, KMLO carries affiliation with ABC News Radio and provides coverage for the Minnesota Vikings. The station's local online hub, DRGNews, provides a wide range of community features, including obituaries, a business directory, bull sale reports, and a job line.
