= KJBI =

- Fort Pierre, South Dakota; United States
- Broadcast area: Pierre, South Dakota
- Frequency: 100.1 MHz
- Branding: 100.1 The Eagle

Programming
- Format: Classic hits w/a rock edge

Ownership
- Owner: Ingstad Family Media; (James River Broadcasting)
- Sister stations: KGFX, KGFX-FM, KMLO, KOLY, KOLY-FM, KPLO

History
- First air date: 2008

Technical information
- Licensing authority: FCC
- Facility ID: 164144
- Class: C1
- ERP: 51,000 watts
- HAAT: 161.5 meters (530 feet)
- Transmitter coordinates: 44°18′30″N 100°20′49″W
- Translators: (107.1 MHz) K296FI (Dickinson, ND); 107.9 K300AN (Chamberlain)

Links
- Public license information: Public file; LMS
- Webcast: Listen Live
- Website: www.drgnews.com/eagle/

KJBI (100.1 FM, "100.1 The Eagle") is a radio station licensed to serve Fort Pierre, South Dakota. The station is owned by Ingstad Family Media and licensed to James River Broadcasting. It airs a classic hits music format with a rock edge.

All four Pierre DRG Media Group (James River Broadcasting) stations share studios at 214 West Pleasant Drive, in Pierre.

The station was first assigned the call letters KJBI by the Federal Communications Commission on August 2, 2007. KJBI's first air date was in 2008. The station is licensed as a Class C1 station and has an effective radiated power (ERP) of 51,000 watts. Its antenna has a height above average terrain (HAAT) of $161.5$ meters (530 feet).In addition to its main signal, KJBI utilizes two FM translators to extend its coverage: K296FI at 107.1 MHz in Dickinson, North Dakota, and K300AN at 107.9 MHz in Chamberlain, South Dakota.

In July 2020, the Dakota Radio Group, which includes KJBI, announced the cancellation of the syndicated program The Bob & Tom Show from all of its stations, specifically mentioning KJBI, following a disparaging comment made by host Tom Griswold about Native Americans during a broadcast. The statement released by the owners, management, and staff indicated that the show would no longer be aired on KJBI or any of their other stations.

KJBI is part of a cluster of stations in the Pierre area owned by Ingstad Family Media, operating under the licensee James River Broadcasting. This cluster is often referred to as DRG Media Group. The Ingstad family has a long history in Midwest radio, with various family members owning and operating radio stations across multiple states, including North Dakota and Minnesota, in addition to South Dakota. The KJBI cluster includes sister stations such as KGFX (AM), KGFX-FM, KMLO, KOLY (AM), KOLY-FM, and KPLO-FM. KGFX has a history in the area dating back to a 1916 amateur radio license.
