= Mobridge Masonic Temple =

- U.S. National Register of Historic Places
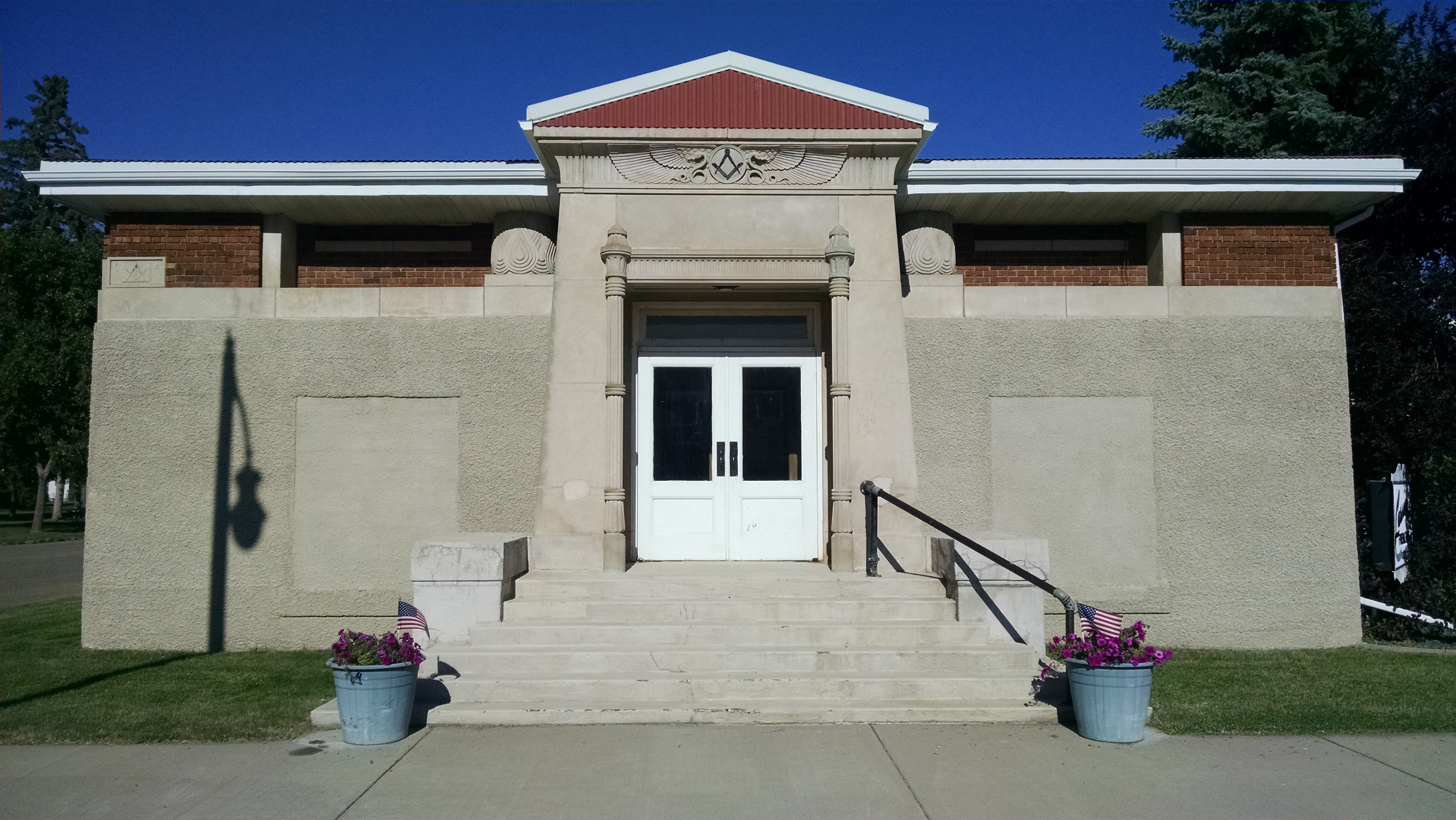
- Mobridge Masonic Temple

- Location within South Dakota Location within the United States
- Location: 522 N Main St, Mobridge, South Dakota
- Coordinates: 45°32′17″N 100°26′0″W
- Area: 1 acre (0.40 ha)
- Built: 1923
- Architectural style: Exotic Revival
- NRHP reference No.: 77001259
- Added to NRHP: March 25, 1977

The Mobridge Masonic Temple in Mobridge, South Dakota is a building from 1923. It was listed on the National Register of Historic Places in 1977.

It was deemed notable as it "is the only known example of Egyptian Revival architecture from the eclectic period in South Dakota. It has many of the elements that are common to this style: battered walls; window enframements that narrow upward; narrow banded reed lotus columns; and a gorge and roll cornice above the entry. All of these create a definite Egyptian appearance."
