= KGFX-FM =

- Pierre, South Dakota; United States
- Broadcast area: Pierre micropolitan area
- Frequency: 92.7 MHz
- Branding: River 92.7

Programming
- Format: Top 40 (CHR)

Ownership
- Owner: Ingstad Family Media; (James River Broadcasting Company)
- Sister stations: KGFX; KJBI; KMLO; KOLY; KOLY-FM; KPLO-FM

History
- First air date: 1983

Technical information
- Licensing authority: FCC
- Facility ID: 56818
- Class: C2
- ERP: 50,000 watts
- HAAT: 148.6 meters (488 ft)
- Transmitter coordinates: 44°18′29.9″N 100°20′50.5″W

Links
- Public license information: Public file; LMS
- Webcast: Listen live
- Website: drgnews.com/river/

KGFX-FM (92.7 FM, "River 92.7") is a radio station broadcasting a Top 40 format. Licensed to Pierre, South Dakota, United States, the station serves the Pierre micropolitan area. The station is owned by James River Broadcasting Company.

All four Pierre DRG Media Group (James River Broadcasting) stations share studios at 214 West Pleasant Drive, in Pierre.

== History ==
The station began in the 1980s as KG93 with a Top 40 (CHR) music format. Later, the format was changed to classic rock and the station was known as 92-7 The Fox. Later, it flipped to hot adult contemporary as River 92.7. In March 2013, the station transitioned to Top 40 (CHR) keeping the River 92.7 moniker.

KGFX-FM is part of the DRG Media Group, a trade name for the Ingstad Family Media's ownership in the area (James River Broadcasting Company). The Ingstad family has extensive involvement in Midwest radio ownership.

KGFX-FM shares a studio complex with its sister stations in Pierre: KGFX (AM), KJBI, KMLO, KOLY (AM), KOLY-FM, and KPLO-FM. The KGFX call letters have a deep history in the Pierre area, tracing back to an amateur station license in 1916 and becoming a commercial broadcast station in 1927, known for its pioneering owner, Ida McNeil, who was affectionately called "Mrs. Pierre".
