= St. Charles Hotel (Pierre, South Dakota) =

- U.S. National Register of Historic Places
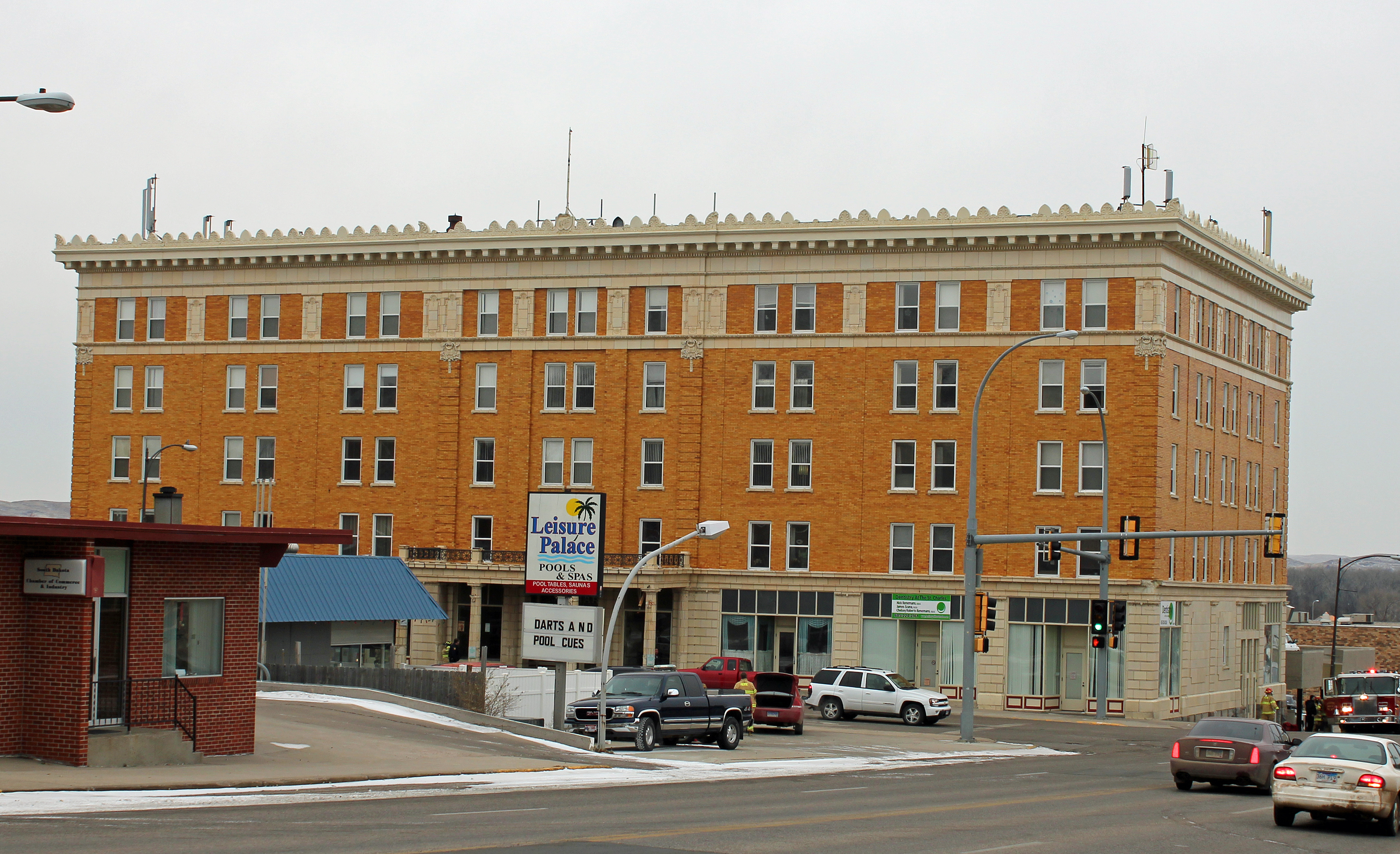

- Location within South Dakota Location within the United States
- Location: 207 E. Capitol Ave., Pierre, South Dakota
- Coordinates: 44°22′6″N 100°21′1″W
- Area: 1 acre (0.40 ha)
- Built: 1920
- NRHP reference No.: 80003724
- Added to NRHP: May 7, 1980

The St. Charles Hotel is a historic hotel located at 207 E. Capitol Ave. in Pierre, South Dakota. The hotel was built in 1911 by Charles Hyde, a prominent Pierre businessman. Hyde had helped establish Pierre's business district; he was later convicted of mail fraud and pardoned by President William Howard Taft. South Dakota Governor Robert S. Vessey hosted the hotel's grand opening, a portent of the hotel's role in South Dakota politics. All members of both houses of the South Dakota Legislature stayed in the hotel while in Pierre, and the legislators often discussed and debated bills in the building. In addition, several governors stayed in the hotel until the South Dakota governor's mansion was built in the 1940s. The hotel has also hosted prominent guests such as President Calvin Coolidge, Dale Carnegie, Bob Hope, and Clark Gable.

The hotel was added to the National Register of Historic Places on May 7, 1980.
