= KOLY-FM =

- Mobridge, South Dakota; United States
- Frequency: 99.5 MHz
- Branding: Star 99

Programming
- Format: Hot adult contemporary

Ownership
- Owner: Ingstad Family Media; (James River Broadcasting)
- Sister stations: KGFX, KGFX-FM, KJBI, KMLO, KOLY, KPLO-FM

History
- First air date: March 25, 1980

Technical information
- Licensing authority: FCC
- Facility ID: 43329
- Class: C1
- ERP: 100,000 watts
- HAAT: 177 meters (581 feet)
- Transmitter coordinates: 45°32′7″N 100°20′45″W

Links
- Public license information: Public file; LMS
- Webcast: Listen Live
- Website: KOLY-FM Online

KOLY-FM (99.5 FM, "Star 99") is a radio station licensed to serve Mobridge, South Dakota. The station is owned by James River Broadcasting, and it airs a hot adult contemporary music format.

KOLY-FM is part of the Dakota Radio Group (DRG Media Group), a cluster owned by Ingstad Family Media (James River Broadcasting). The Ingstad family is a notable force in Midwest radio ownership.

KOLY-FM shares studio space with its sister stations in Mobridge: KOLY (AM) and KMLO-FM. The three Mobridge stations are a local source for news and community information. The cluster is managed locally, with Diane Deis listed as the General Manager. The KOLY AM and FM transmitters and the 581 foot tower are east of town on Highway 12.

The station was assigned the KOLY-FM call letters by the Federal Communications Commission on March 25, 1980.

== Personalities ==
In 2006, sports director Pat Morrison celebrated 50 years on the air at KOLY-AM/FM as the voice of Mobridge High School.
