= Selby Opera House =

- U.S. National Register of Historic Places
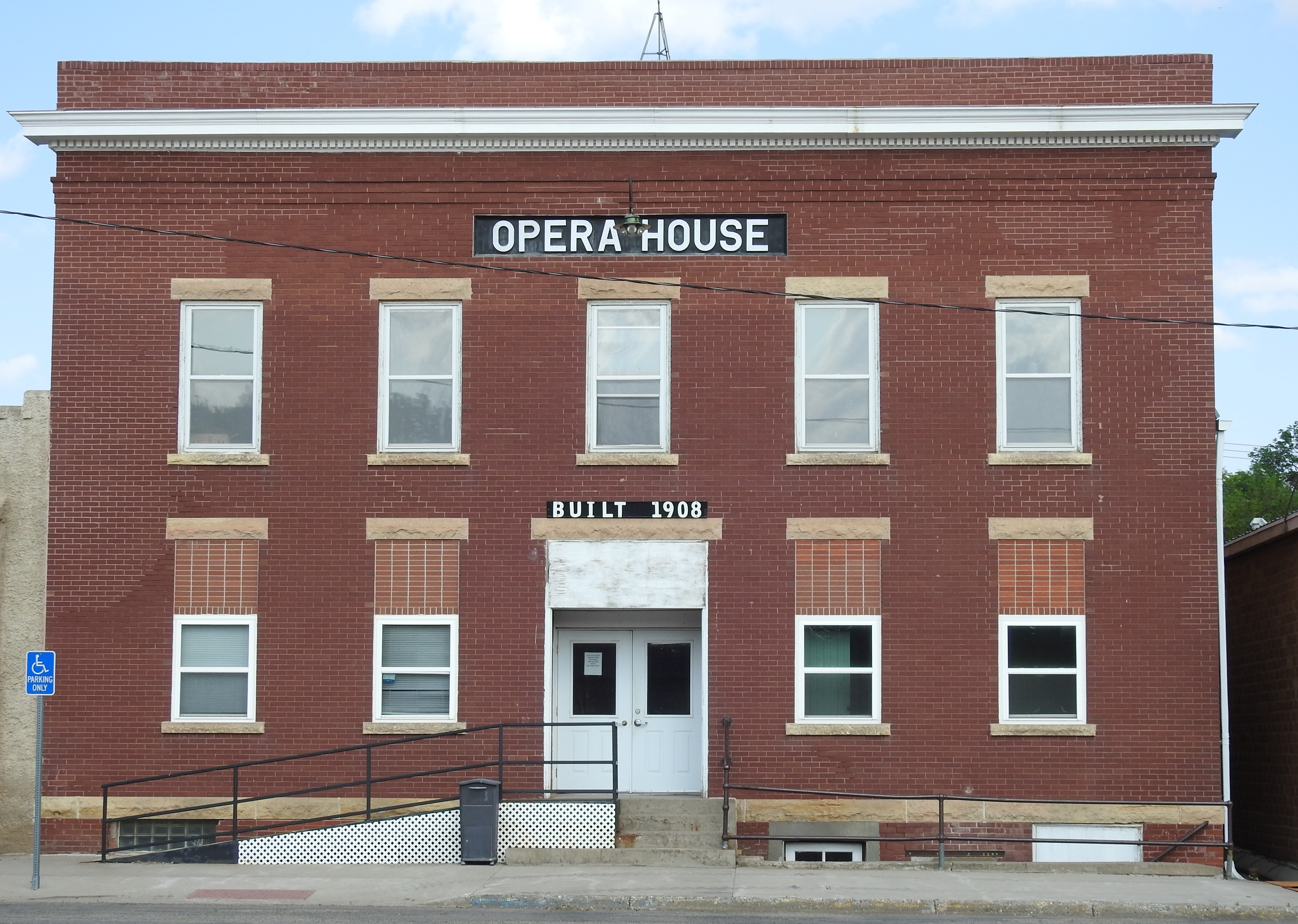

- Location within South Dakota Location within the United States
- Location: 3409 Main St., Selby, South Dakota
- Coordinates: 45°30′23″N 100°01′06″W
- Area: less than one acre
- Built: 1909
- Architectural style: Classical Revival
- NRHP reference No.: 87001730
- Added to NRHP: September 25, 1987

The Selby Opera House, at 3409 Main St. in Selby, South Dakota is a Classical Revival building built in 1909. It was listed on the National Register of Historic Places in 1987.

It is a two-story building on a masonry basement, chiefly a two-story auditorium.

It was deemed significant for having "over seventy-five years served as the primary entertainment facility in Selby and the surrounding community."
