= Mobridge, South Dakota =

Mobridge Kȟowákataŋ Otȟúŋwahe Bridge City
- City
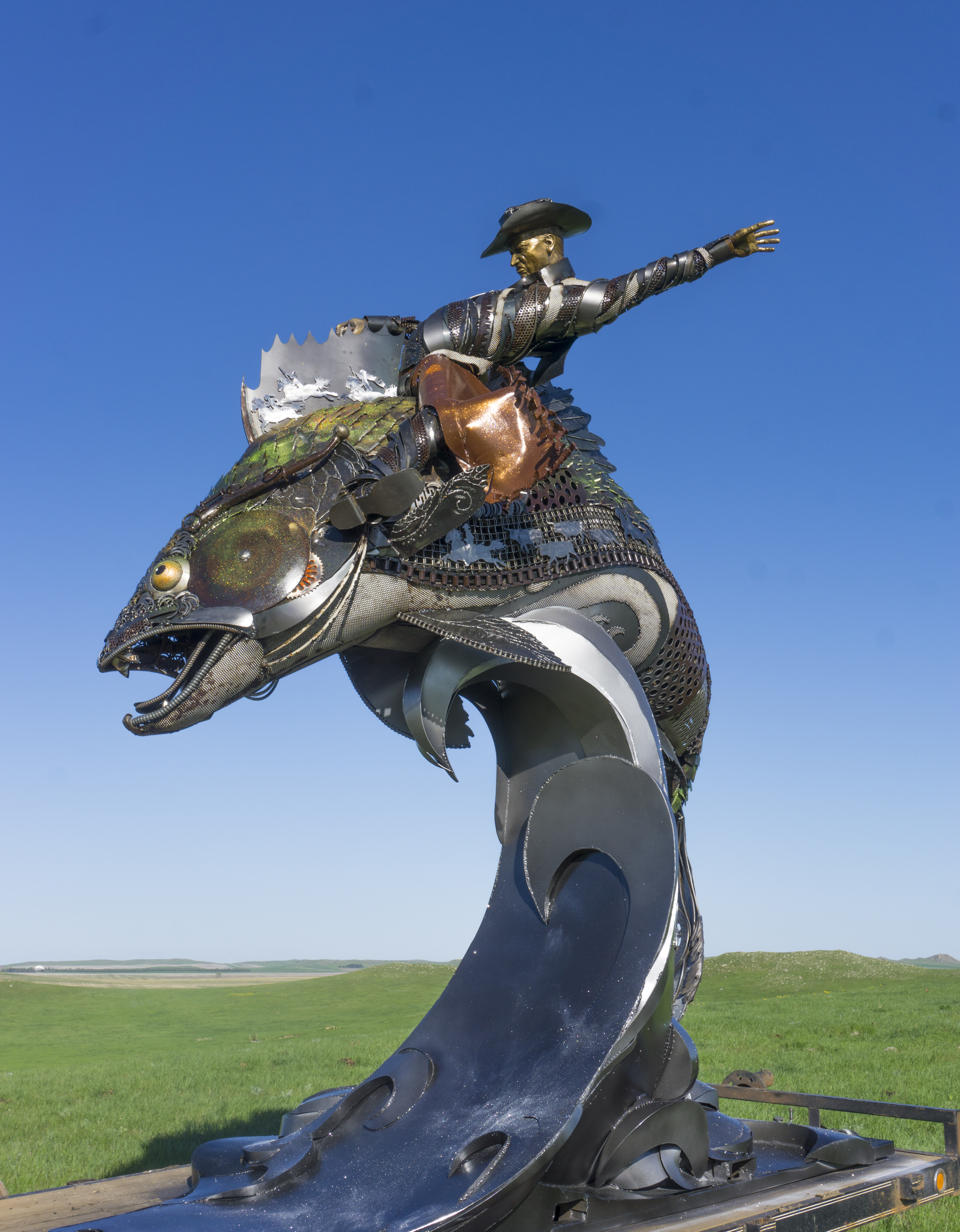
- Scrap metal sculpture of a cowboy riding a walleye on the south end of main street in Mobridge
- Nicknames: Mo-Town or Mo-Town, USA
- Motto: Make It Mobridge
- Location in Walworth County and the state of South Dakota

- Location within South Dakota Location within the United States
- Coordinates: 45°32′27″N 100°26′06″W
- Country: United States
- State: South Dakota
- County: Walworth
- Founded: 1906

Government
  - Type: Municipal
  - Mayor: Gene Cox

Area
  - Total: 1.96 sq mi (5.08 km^{2})
  - Land: 1.96 sq mi (5.08 km^{2})
  - Water: 0 sq mi (0.00 km^{2})
- Elevation: 1,660 ft (510 m)

Population (2020)
  - Total: 3,261
  - Density: 1,663.9/sq mi (642.42/km^{2})
- Time zone: UTC−6 (Central (CST))
  - Summer (DST): UTC−5 (CDT)
- ZIP code: 57601
- Area code: 605
- FIPS code: 46-43180
- GNIS feature ID: 1267481
- Website: City of Mobridge

Mobridge is a city in Walworth County, South Dakota, United States. The population was 3,261 as of the 2020 census.

== History ==
Located in territory that had long been occupied by the Lakota Sioux, Mobridge was founded by European Americans in 1906 following construction of the Chicago, Milwaukee, St. Paul and Pacific Railroad through here. The town was named Mobridge for its railroad designation, a contracted form of Missouri Bridge, after the original railroad bridge over the Missouri River. The bridge was demolished by the Corps of Engineers in the early 1960s and replaced by a taller bridge due to the construction of the Oahe Dam.

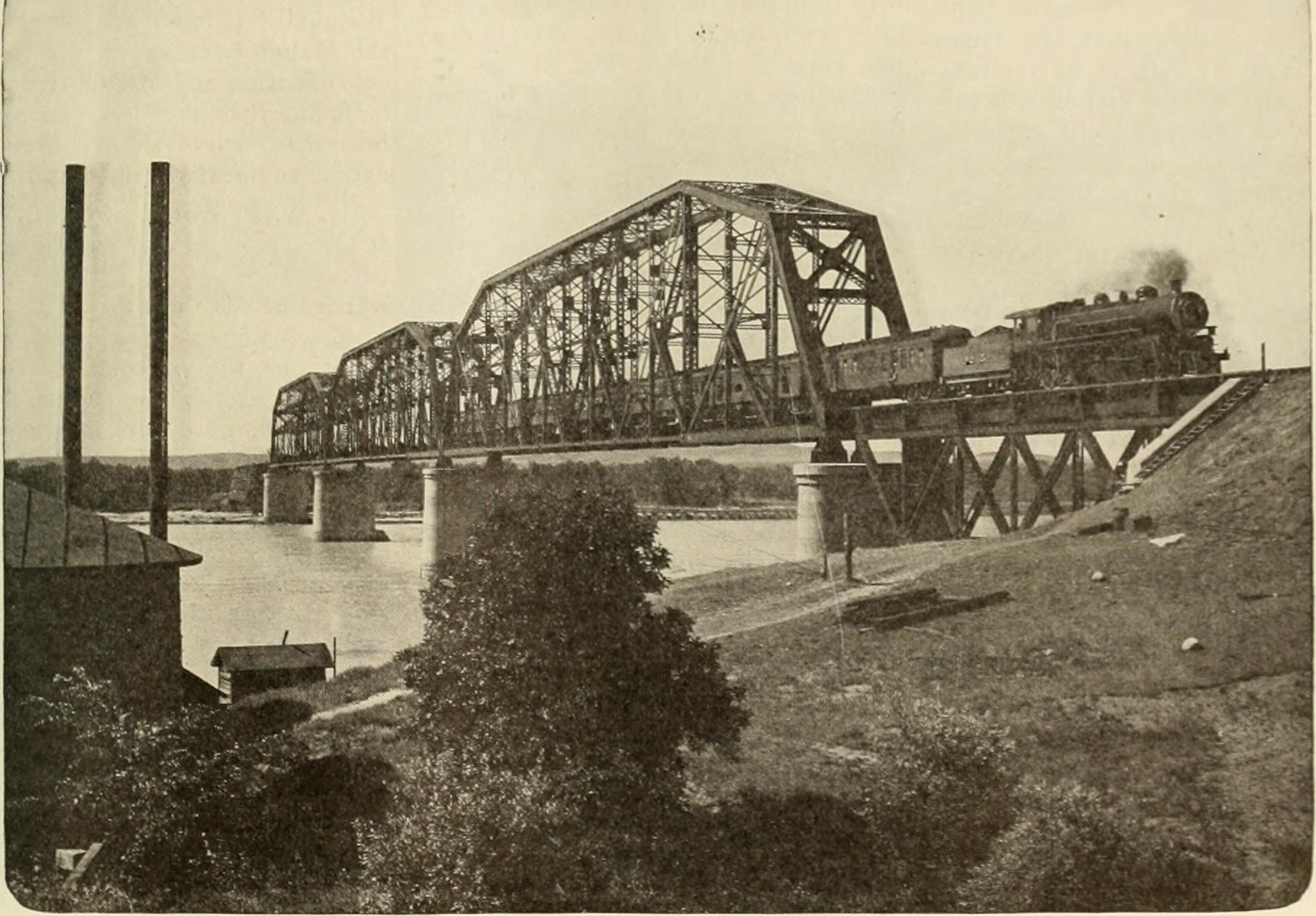
Steel bridge over the Missouri River, Mobridge, South Dakota (1911)

There are disputed claims that some or all of chief Sitting Bull's remains were moved by his surviving relatives and the Dakota Memorial Association on April 8, 1953 from Fort Yates, North Dakota, where he had been killed and buried, to Mobridge, which was near his birthplace. The Mobridge burial site is marked by a monument consisting of his bust on a granite pedestal; it overlooks the Missouri River. It was dedicated by the Dakota Memorial Association on April 11, 1953.

Notable monuments to Sioux people

Monument to Sitting Bull

Sakakawea grave site

The Brown Palace Hotel in Mobridge is listed on the U.S. National Register of Historic Places. Artist Oscar Howe (Yanktonai Dakota) painted a mural for the town's auditorium. The Mobridge Masonic Temple was built in Egyptian Revival style in 1923.

== Geography ==
According to the United States Census Bureau, the city has a total area of 1.89 square miles (4.90 km^{2}), all land.

=== Climate ===
Climate data for Mobridge Municipal Airport, South Dakota (1991–2020 normals, (Note: Mean monthly maxima and minima (i.e. the expected highest and lowest temperature readings at any point during the year or given month) calculated based on data at said location from 1991 to 2020.) extremes 1911–present (Note: Records maintained at the Mobridge 2 NNW COOP before April 1998, and at Mobridge Municipal Airport since April 1998.))
Month	Jan	Feb	Mar	Apr	May	Jun	Jul	Aug	Sep	Oct	Nov	Dec	Year
Record high °F (°C)	64 (18)	73 (23)	85 (29)	96 (36)	108 (42)	110 (43)	116 (47)	110 (43)	107 (42)	95 (35)	78 (26)	71 (22)	116 (47)
Mean maximum °F (°C)	48.3 (9.1)	52.4 (11.3)	68.4 (20.2)	81.8 (27.7)	88.2 (31.2)	93.7 (34.3)	98.8 (37.1)	98.7 (37.1)	94.3 (34.6)	82.5 (28.1)	66.4 (19.1)	50.6 (10.3)	101.9 (38.8)
Mean daily maximum °F (°C)	27.1 (−2.7)	31.6 (−0.2)	44.6 (7.0)	58.6 (14.8)	70.2 (21.2)	80.1 (26.7)	87.4 (30.8)	86.0 (30.0)	76.5 (24.7)	60.4 (15.8)	44.2 (6.8)	31.6 (−0.2)	58.2 (14.6)
Daily mean °F (°C)	16.8 (−8.4)	21.2 (−6.0)	33.4 (0.8)	45.8 (7.7)	57.6 (14.2)	67.9 (19.9)	74.5 (23.6)	72.8 (22.7)	63.2 (17.3)	48.4 (9.1)	33.5 (0.8)	21.8 (−5.7)	46.4 (8.0)
Mean daily minimum °F (°C)	6.4 (−14.2)	10.7 (−11.8)	22.2 (−5.4)	33.0 (0.6)	45.0 (7.2)	55.7 (13.2)	61.6 (16.4)	59.6 (15.3)	49.9 (9.9)	36.5 (2.5)	22.8 (−5.1)	12.0 (−11.1)	34.6 (1.4)
Mean minimum °F (°C)	−19.7 (−28.7)	−14.4 (−25.8)	−2.2 (−19.0)	14.7 (−9.6)	28.9 (−1.7)	42.9 (6.1)	49.5 (9.7)	46.5 (8.1)	33.4 (0.8)	18.6 (−7.4)	4.5 (−15.3)	−12.2 (−24.6)	−23.6 (−30.9)
Record low °F (°C)	−42 (−41)	−44 (−42)	−26 (−32)	−1 (−18)	15 (−9)	32 (0)	38 (3)	32 (0)	17 (−8)	−1 (−18)	−20 (−29)	−41 (−41)	−44 (−42)
Average precipitation inches (mm)	0.38 (9.7)	0.65 (17)	0.71 (18)	1.58 (40)	2.94 (75)	3.08 (78)	2.33 (59)	2.05 (52)	1.52 (39)	1.81 (46)	0.43 (11)	0.51 (13)	17.99 (457)
Average snowfall inches (cm)	6.3 (16)	6.4 (16)	4.1 (10)	3.2 (8.1)	0.0 (0.0)	0.0 (0.0)	0.0 (0.0)	0.0 (0.0)	0.0 (0.0)	1.7 (4.3)	3.6 (9.1)	5.7 (14)	31.0 (79)
Average extreme snow depth inches (cm)	7.6 (19)	8.4 (21)	6.2 (16)	3.0 (7.6)	0.1 (0.25)	0.0 (0.0)	0.0 (0.0)	0.0 (0.0)	0.0 (0.0)	0.8 (2.0)	2.9 (7.4)	5.4 (14)	12.4 (31)
Average precipitation days (≥ 0.01 in)	6.2	6.7	7.1	7.8	10.8	11.6	8.9	8.3	7.1	7.7	3.9	5.1	91.2
Average snowy days (≥ 0.1 in)	5.8	4.9	3.5	1.4	0.0	0.0	0.0	0.0	0.0	0.9	2.4	4.3	23.0
Source: NOAA

== Demographics ==
Historical population
Census	Pop.	Note	%±
1910	1,200		—
1920	3,517		193.1%
1930	3,464		−1.5%
1940	3,008		−13.2%
1950	3,753		24.8%
1960	4,391		17.0%
1970	4,545		3.5%
1980	4,174		−8.2%
1990	3,768		−9.7%
2000	3,574		−5.1%
2010	3,465		−3.0%
2020	3,261		−5.9%
U.S. Decennial Census

=== 2020 census ===
As of the 2020 census, Mobridge had a population of 3,261. The median age was 39.3 years, 24.5% of residents were under the age of 18, and 22.3% were 65 years of age or older. For every 100 females there were 94.1 males, and for every 100 females age 18 and over there were 92.9 males age 18 and over.

There were 1,418 households in Mobridge, of which 26.7% had children under the age of 18 living in them. Of all households, 40.4% were married-couple households, 20.9% were households with a male householder and no spouse or partner present, and 30.3% were households with a female householder and no spouse or partner present. About 36.5% of households were made up of individuals, and 18.3% had someone living alone who was 65 years of age or older.

There were 1,687 housing units, of which 15.9% were vacant. The homeowner vacancy rate was 3.1% and the rental vacancy rate was 9.1%.

0.0% of residents lived in urban areas, while 100.0% lived in rural areas.

Racial composition as of the 2020 census
Race	Number	Percent
White	2,247	68.9%
Black or African American	9	0.3%
American Indian and Alaska Native	749	23.0%
Asian	8	0.2%
Native Hawaiian and Other Pacific Islander	0	0.0%
Some other race	10	0.3%
Two or more races	238	7.3%
Hispanic or Latino (of any race)	67	2.1%

=== 2010 census ===
Postcard depicting a Lakota Sioux ceremonial dance in Mobridge, South Dakota (1904)

As of the census of 2010, there were 3,465 people, 1,514 households, and 898 families living in the city. The population density was 1,833.3 inhabitants per square mile (707.8/km^{2}). There were 1,727 housing units at an average density of 913.8 per square mile (352.8/km^{2}). The racial makeup of the city was 75.7% White, 0.2% African American, 20.5% Native American, 0.4% Asian, 0.2% from other races, and 3.1% from two or more races. Hispanic or Latino of any race were 0.8% of the population.

There were 1,514 households, of which 27.7% had children under the age of 18 living with them, 43.5% were married couples living together, 11.2% had a female householder with no husband present, 4.6% had a male householder with no wife present, and 40.7% were non-families. 34.9% of all households were made up of individuals, and 16.6% had someone living alone who was 65 years of age or older. The average household size was 2.22 and the average family size was 2.86.

The median age in the city was 44 years. 23.6% of residents were under the age of 18; 7.3% were between the ages of 18 and 24; 20% were from 25 to 44; 26.2% were from 45 to 64; and 22.9% were 65 years of age or older. The gender makeup of the city was 48.1% male and 51.9% female.

=== 2000 census ===
As of the census of 2000, there were 3,574 people, 1,545 households, and 948 families living in the city. The population density was 2,009.4 inhabitants per square mile (775.8/km^{2}). There were 1,808 housing units at an average density of 1,016.5 per square mile (392.5/km^{2}). The racial makeup of the city was 79.52% White, 0.03% African American, 18.13% Native American, 0.22% Asian, 0.06% Pacific Islander, 0.08% from other races, and 1.96% from two or more races. 0.84% of the population is Hispanic or Latino of any race.

There were 1,545 households, out of which 26.4% had children under the age of 18 living with them, 46.5% were married couples living together, 11.5% had a female householder with no husband present, and 38.6% were non-families. 35.1% of all households were made up of individuals, and 17.8% had someone living alone who was 65 years of age or older. The average household size was 2.24 and the average family size was 2.88.

In the city, the population was spread out, with 24.3% under the age of 18, 7.4% from 18 to 24, 22.8% from 25 to 44, 23.2% from 45 to 64, and 22.3% who were 65 years of age or older. The median age was 41 years. For every 100 females, there were 89.6 males. For every 100 females age 18 and over, there were 85.1 males.

As of 2000 the median income for a household in the city was $25,583, and the median income for a family was $31,026. Males had a median income of $22,727 versus $16,990 for females. The per capita income for the city was $14,921. About 18.1% of families and 21.6% of the population were below the poverty line, including 32.2% of those under age 18 and 15.4% of those age 65 or over.

== Media ==
=== AM Radio ===
AM radio stations
Frequency	Call sign	Name	Format	Owner	City
1300 AM	KOLY		Hot AC	Dakota Radio Group	Mobridge

=== FM Radio ===
FM radio stations
Frequency	Call sign	Name	Format	Owner	Target city/market	City of license
99.5 FM	KOLY-FM	Star 99	Hot AC	Dakota Radio Group	Mobridge	Mobridge
100.7 FM	KMLO	Country 101	Country	Dakota Radio Group	Mobridge	Mobridge

=== Television ===
- KBME-TV Ch. 3 PBS (PPT)
- KPRY-TV Ch. 4 ABC/CW+ (Pierre)
- KFYR-TV Ch. 5 NBC/Fox (Bismarck)
- KPLO-TV Ch. 6 CBS/MyNetworkTV (Reliance–Pierre)
- KQSD-TV Ch. 11 PBS (SDPB)
- KXMB-TV Ch. 12 CBS/CW+ (Bismarck)

=== Newspaper ===
- Mobridge Tribune

== Government ==
Mobridge uses a city council consisting of seven council members including the mayor. As of March 2020, the current mayor is Gene Cox.

== Notable people ==
- Sitting Bull, Lakota Sioux leader
- James R. Carrigan, United States District Court judge and Colorado Supreme Court justice
- C. Allin Cornell, Professor of civil engineering at Stanford University and developer of the field of probabilistic seismic hazard analysis
- George S. Mickelson, former Governor of South Dakota
- Bill Mott, National Museum of Racing and Hall of Fame thoroughbred trainer

== See also ==
- One World Direct
