= KPLO-FM =

- Reliance, South Dakota; United States
- Broadcast area: Pierre, South Dakota
- Frequency: 94.5 MHz

Programming
- Format: Country
- Affiliations: Minnesota Vikings

Ownership
- Owner: Ingstad Family Media; (James River Broadcasting Company)
- Sister stations: KGFX; KGFX-FM; KJBI; KMLO; KOLY; KOLY-FM

History
- First air date: February 20, 1985
- Call sign meaning: Pierre's KELO (from former sister station KPLO-TV)

Technical information
- Licensing authority: FCC
- Facility ID: 40635
- Class: C0
- ERP: 100,000 watts
- HAAT: 301 meters (988 ft)
- Transmitter coordinates: 43°54′27″N 99°41′47.4″W
- Translator: 100.5 K263AW (Pierre)

Links
- Public license information: Public file; LMS
- Webcast: Listen live
- Website: www.drgnews.com/kplo/

KPLO-FM (94.5 MHz) is a radio station licensed to serve Reliance, South Dakota. The station is owned by James River Broadcasting, branded as DRG Media Group. It airs a country music format. All four Pierre DRG Media Group (James River Broadcasting) stations share studios on West Pleasant Drive in Pierre.

The station was first assigned the call letters KPLO-FM by the Federal Communications Commission (FCC) on February 20, 1985. The call letters themselves are historically significant, being tied to the former television sister station KPLO-TV. This former sister station served the South Dakota capital area and was a semi-satellite of KELO-TV in Sioux Falls.

On January 22, 2010, the KPLO-FM tower, which it shared with KPLO-TV, collapsed during a severe ice storm. Following the incident, the station was off the air for a time, which left the Pierre area without a signal. However, by February 8, 2010, KPLO-FM was back on the air in the Pierre and Fort Pierre area, operating via an FM translator at 100.5 MHz. The tower was ultimately rebuilt. The station also utilizes a secondary translator on 100.5 MHz (K263AW) in Pierre to assist in coverage.
