= KOLY (AM) =

- Mobridge, South Dakota; United States
- Frequency: 1300 kHz
- Branding: KOLY AM 1300 FM 101.9

Programming
- Format: Classic hits/news/talk
- Affiliations: ABC News Radio

Ownership
- Owner: Ingstad Family Media; (James River Broadcasting)
- Sister stations: KGFX, KGFX-FM, KJBI, KMLO, KOLY-FM, KPLO-FM

History
- First air date: 1956

Technical information
- Licensing authority: FCC
- Facility ID: 43330
- Class: B
- Power: 5,000 watts day 111 watts night
- Transmitter coordinates: 45°32′07″N 100°20′45″W
- Translator: 101.9 K270CU (Mobridge)

Links
- Public license information: Public file; LMS
- Webcast: Listen Live
- Website: KOLY Online

Former logo

KOLY (1300 kHz) is an AM radio station licensed to serve Mobridge, South Dakota. The station is owned by James River Broadcasting. It airs a full-service oldies-lean classic hits music format with extensive news, agricultural reports, and sports. In the early 1980s, KOLY-AM featured a country music format, local and national news, and agricultural information.

KOLY is part of the Dakota Radio Group (DRG Media Group), which is owned by Ingstad Family Media (James River Broadcasting). All three of the DRG stations in Mobridge—KOLY (AM), KOLY-FM, and KMLO—share studios at 118 3rd St. East, in Mobridge.

The sister stations in the Mobridge/Pierre cluster include KGFX (AM), KGFX-FM, KJBI, KMLO, KOLY-FM, and KPLO-FM.

KOLY first went on the air in 1956. It was assigned the call letters KOLY by the Federal Communications Commission (FCC).

In the early 1980s, the station featured a country music format, local and national news, and agricultural information. The format later evolved into its current full-service classic hits/news/talk mixture.

== Personalities ==
In 2006, sports director Pat Morrison celebrated 50 years on the air at KOLY-AM/FM as the voice of Mobridge High School.
