= Brown Palace Hotel (Mobridge, South Dakota) =

Historic hotel in South Dakota, United States

- U.S. National Register of Historic Places
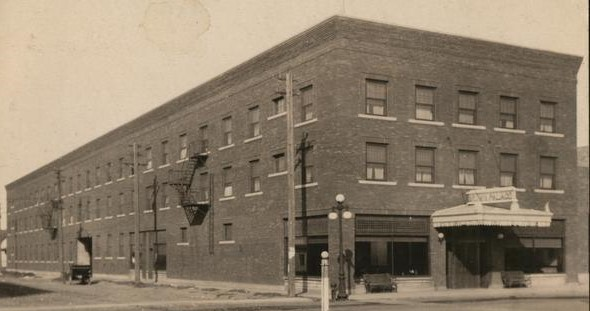
- The hotel on a 1922 postcard

- Location within South Dakota Location within the United States
- Location: 301 Main St., Mobridge, South Dakota
- Coordinates: 45°32′8″N 100°26′2″W
- Built: 1915-1918
- Built by: Herges, Clarence L.
- NRHP reference No.: 83003022
- Added to NRHP: January 27, 1983

The Brown Palace Hotel, in Mobridge, South Dakota, United States, is a hotel that was started in 1915 and completed three years later. It was listed on the National Register of Historic Places in 1983.

It is a three-story brick-veneered frame building, 50 feet (15 m) by 300 feet (91 m) in plan, with simple Arts and Crafts details. It was an enterprise of Albert H. Brown, a businessman. He also donated the A. H. Brown Public Library, which is also listed on the National Register.
