= KCCR-FM =

Coordinates: 44.369052°N 100.351869°W

- Blunt, South Dakota; United States
- Broadcast area: Pierre, South Dakota
- Frequency: 104.5 MHz
- Branding: Capital City ROCK 104.5

Programming
- Format: Active rock

Ownership
- Owner: Riverfront Broadcasting LLC
- Sister stations: KLXS-FM, KCCR

Technical information
- Licensing authority: FCC
- Facility ID: 190370
- Class: C1
- ERP: 100,000 watts
- HAAT: 158 meters (518 ft)

Links
- Public license information: Public file; LMS
- Webcast: Listen live
- Website: capitalcityrock.com

KCCR-FM (104.5 FM) is a radio station licensed to Blunt, South Dakota, serving the Pierre, South Dakota market. The station airs an active rock format, and is owned by Riverfront Broadcasting LLC. KCCR-FM is branded "Capital City ROCK 104.5".

== History ==
KCCR-FM first signed on the air on June 13, 2014. The station is licensed to Blunt but serves the greater Pierre market with a strong signal.

The station is owned by Riverfront Broadcasting LLC, a Yankton, South Dakota company that also owns KCCR (AM) and KLXS-FM in the Pierre area.
