= A. H. Brown Public Library =

- Brown, A. H., Public Library
- U.S. National Register of Historic Places
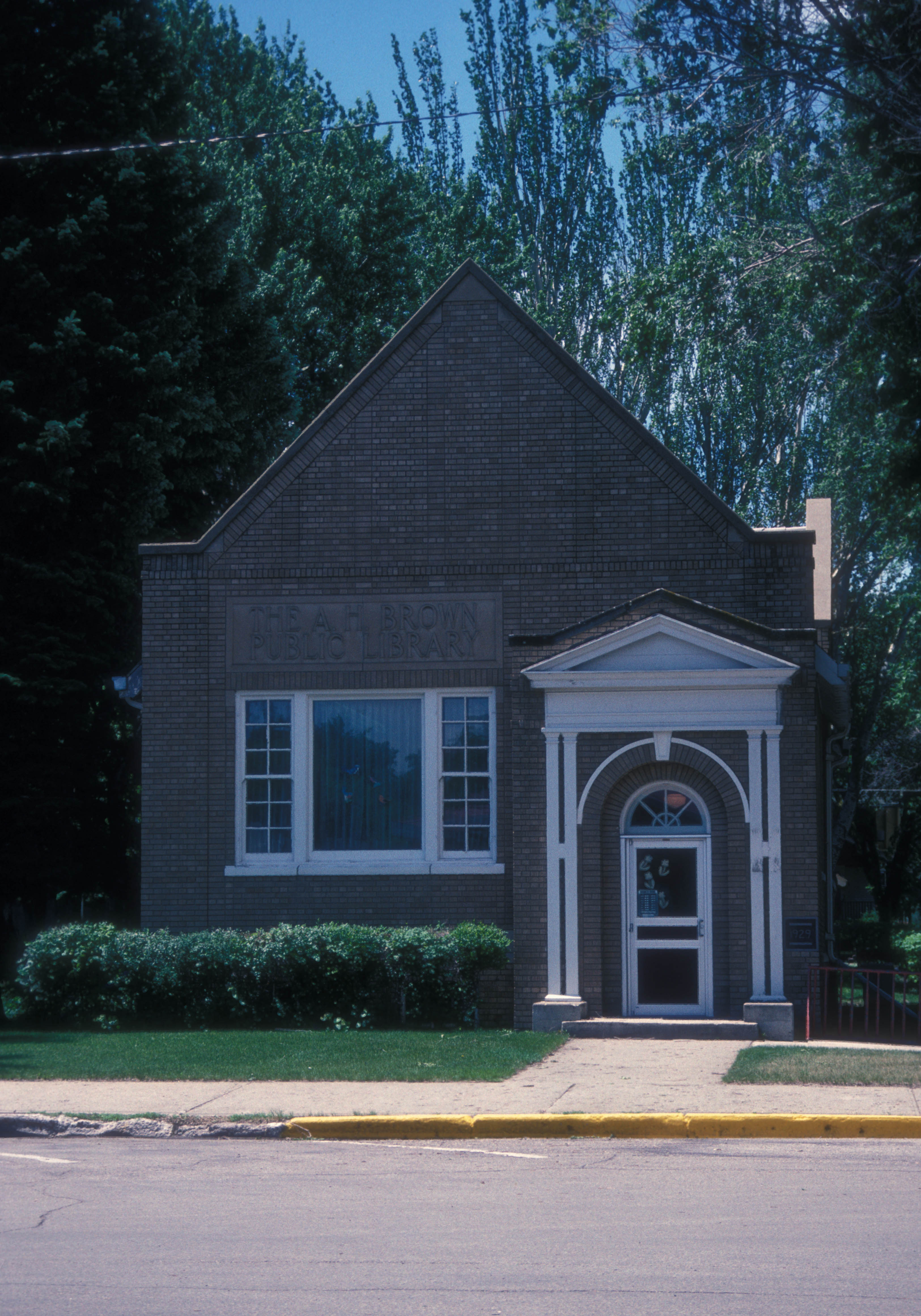

- Location within South Dakota Location within the United States
- Location: N. Main St., Mobridge, South Dakota
- Coordinates: 45°32′17″N 100°26′02″W
- Area: 1 acre (0.40 ha)
- Built: 1930
- Architect: George Fossum
- Architectural style: Tudor Revival, English medieval
- NRHP reference No.: 78002573
- Added to NRHP: December 22, 1978

The A.H. Brown Public Library, also known as the Mobridge Public Library, on N. Main St. in Mobridge, South Dakota, was built in 1930. It was listed on the National Register of Historic Places in 1978.

It was designed by architect George Fossum, of Aberdeen, South Dakota. Its NRHP nomination argues that the building is one of Mobridge's most important buildings" and that it "provides a good example of the type of architecture prevalent during the eclectic period: The library borrows from the classical, Jacobethan, and English Medieval modes. The library has been and continues to be a purveyor of educational material to the community. Also the building is important because it represents the philanthropy of A.H.Brown, a successful local businessman."
