= KCCR (AM) =

- Pierre, South Dakota; United States
- Frequency: 1240 kHz
- Branding: Today's KCCR

Programming
- Format: Full service Classic hits
- Affiliations: ABC News Radio; ESPN Radio; Compass Media Networks; Westwood One

Ownership
- Owner: Riverfront Broadcasting LLC
- Sister stations: KLXS-FM, KCCR-FM

History
- First air date: May 1959 (on 1590)
- Former frequencies: 1590 kHz (1959-1965

Technical information
- Licensing authority: FCC
- Facility ID: 60858
- Class: C
- Power: 1,000 watts unlimited
- Transmitter coordinates: 44°21′2″N 100°19′8″W
- Translator: 98.9 K255DE (Pierre)

Links
- Public license information: Public file; LMS
- Webcast: Listen live
- Website: www.kccrradio.com

KCCR (1240 kHz) is an AM radio station broadcasting a classic hits music format. Licensed to Pierre, South Dakota, United States, the station serves the Pierre area. The station is currently owned by Riverfront Broadcasting LLC of Yankton, South Dakota.

== History ==
KCCR first signed on the air on February 4, 1959, broadcasting on a frequency of 1590 kHz. The original studio was located above the Harding Ford Garage on West Sioux Avenue in Pierre, South Dakota. In February 1965, the station received approval from the FCC to change its frequency from 1590 kHz to its current location on 1240 kHz, allowing it to switch from daytime-only operation to full-time operation. KCCR was one of the first radio stations in the United States to install an all-solid-state Harris MW-1 Transmitter in 1975. KCCR was affiliated with the Mutual Broadcasting System in 1963. It joined the ABC Information Network in 1972 and remained an affiliate until 1984, when it switched its affiliation to CBS News Radio. In 1972, the station was acquired by Sorenson Broadcasting Corporation, co-owned by Dean Sorenson and Thomas "Jerry" Simmons. Sorenson became both President and General Manager. Sorenson Broadcasting owned and operated the station for 34 years until 2006. Dean Sorenson was later inducted into the South Dakota Hall of Fame for his impact on radio in the state.

After a brief period under NRG Media, the station was purchased in 2008 by Riverfront Broadcasting LLC, a company owned by Yankton, South Dakota residents Carolyn and Doyle Becker as part of a six station deal.

Logo before translator sign on
