= Pierre, South Dakota =

Capital city of South Dakota, United States

- State capital city
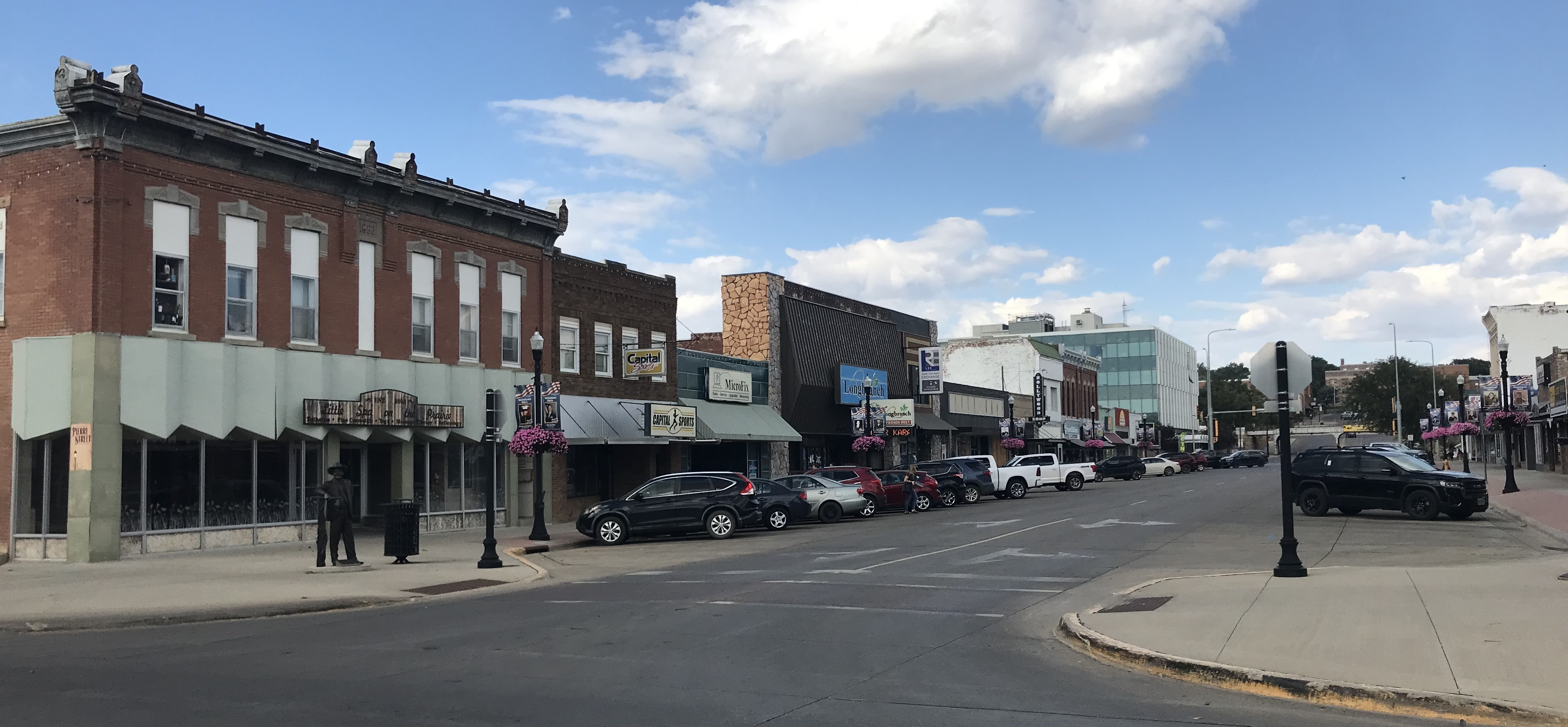
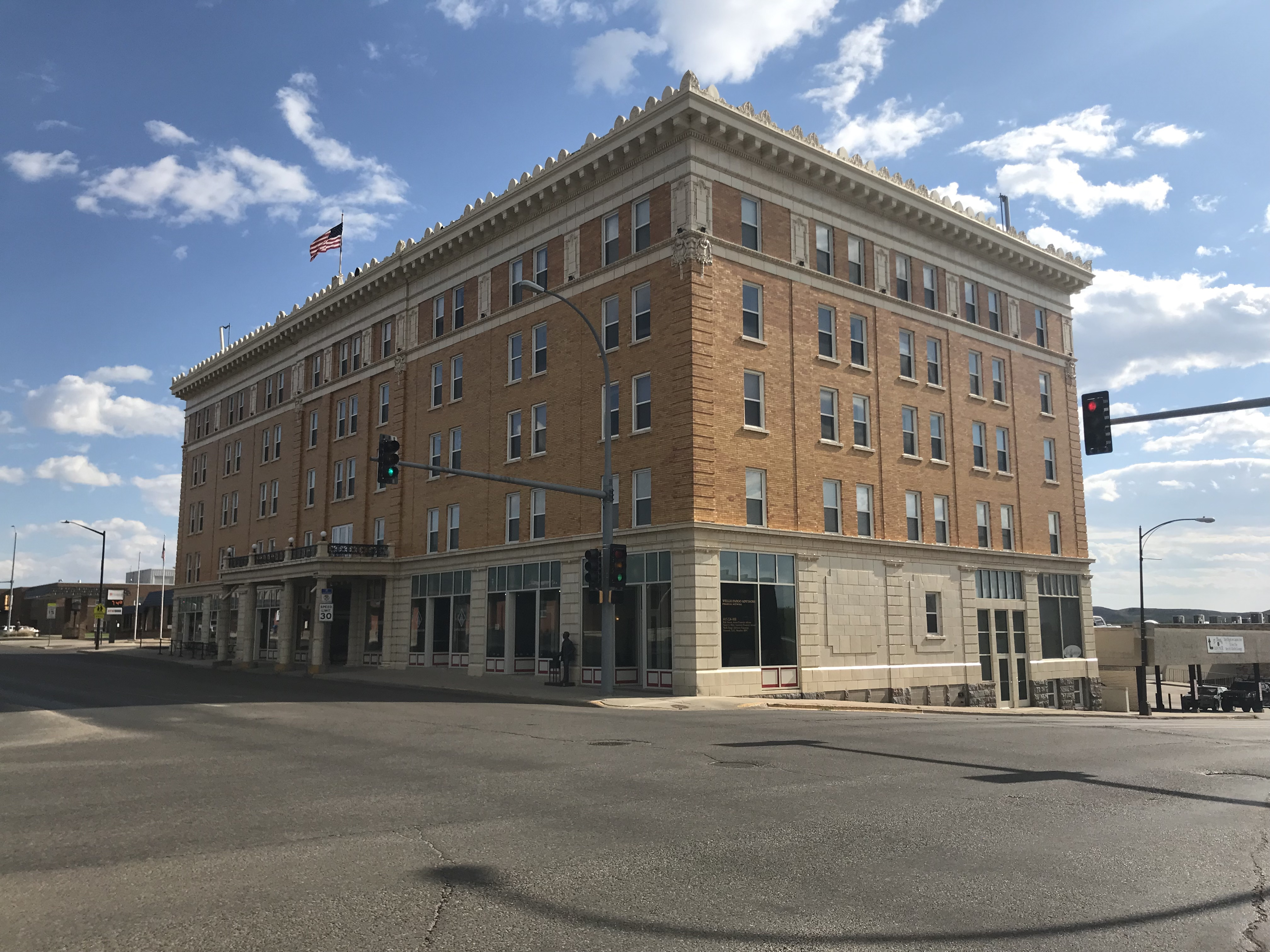
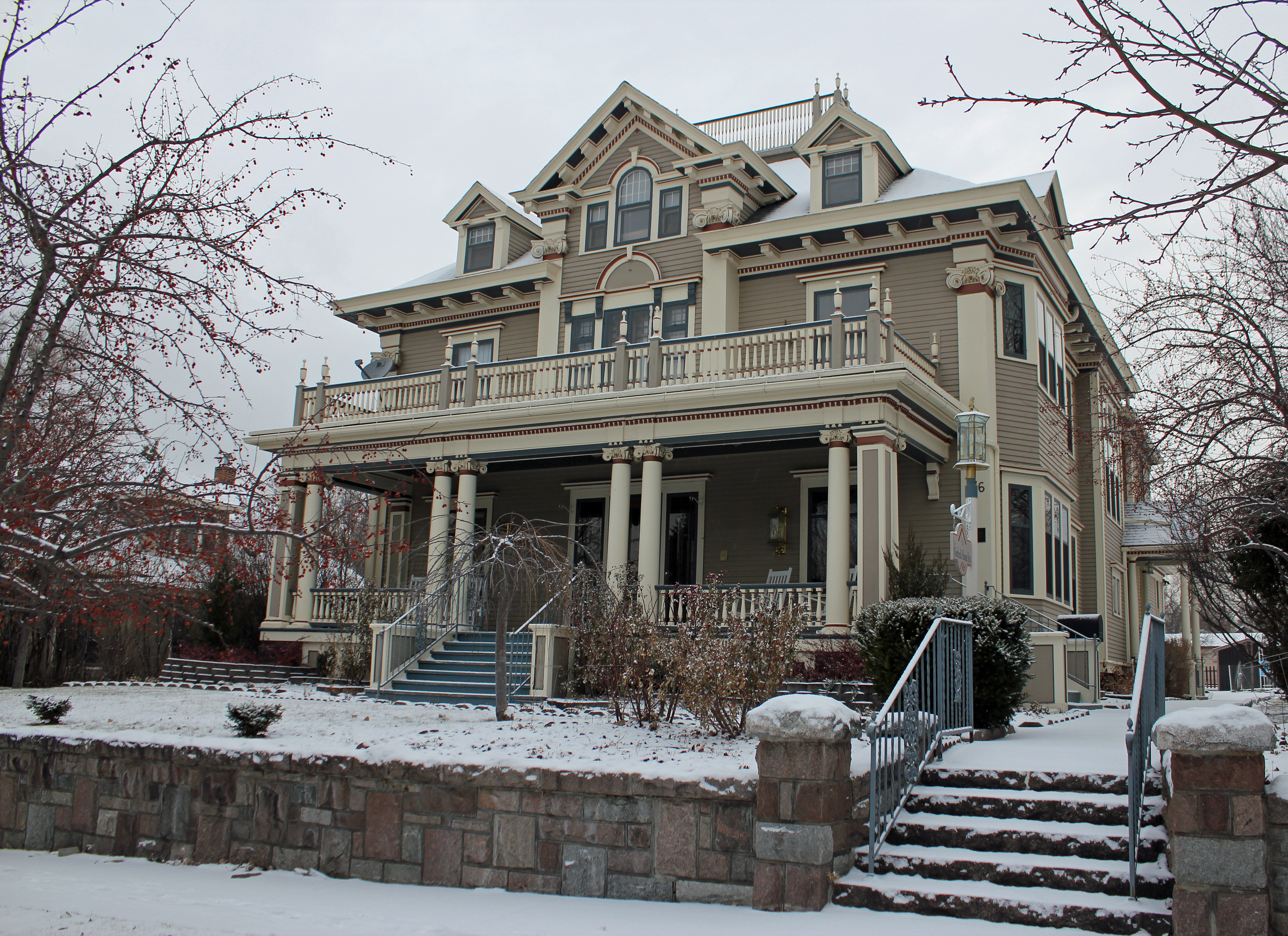
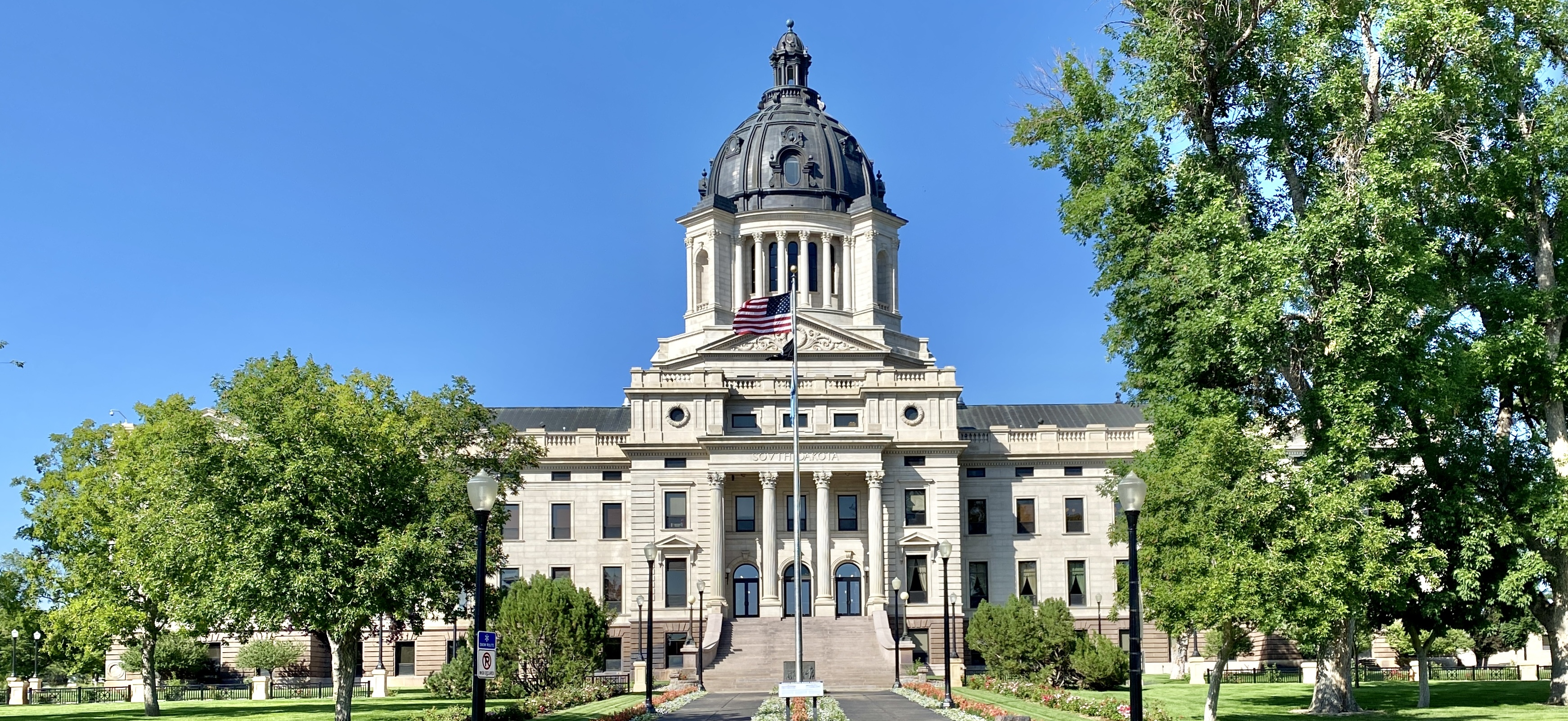
- Pierre Street, Downtown Pierre St. Charles Hotel Farr House South Dakota State Capitol

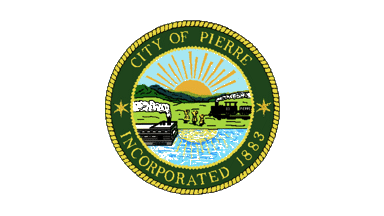
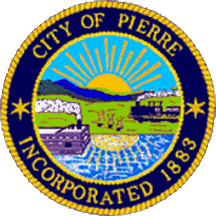
- Flag Seal Logo
- Motto: "On The River-On The Move"
- Location within Hughes County in South Dakota

- Location within South Dakota Location within the United States
- Coordinates: 44°22′29″N 100°19′14″W
- Country: United States
- State: South Dakota
- County: Hughes
- Founded: 1880
- Incorporated: 1883
- Chartered: 1900
- Named for: Pierre Chouteau Jr.

Government
  - Mayor: Steve Harding

Area
  - Total: 13.05 sq mi (33.80 km^{2})
  - Land: 13.03 sq mi (33.74 km^{2})
  - Water: 0.019 sq mi (0.05 km^{2}) 0.08%
- Elevation: 1,700 ft (520 m)

Population (2020)
  - Total: 14,091
  - Density: 1,081.7/sq mi (417.63/km^{2})
- Time zone: UTC-06:00 (CST)
  - Summer (DST): UTC-05:00 (CDT)
- ZIP code: 57501
- Area code: 605
- FIPS code: 46-49600
- GNIS feature ID: 1267533
- Website: cityofpierre.org

Pierre (/pɪər/ PEER) is the capital city of the U.S. state of South Dakota and the county seat of Hughes County. As of the 2020 census, its population was 14,091. Pierre is the eleventh-most populous city of South Dakota, and the second-least populous U.S. state capital (after only Montpelier, Vermont).

Founded in 1880 on the Missouri River, the city was selected to be the state capital when South Dakota was admitted as a state in 1889. Near the center of the state, the then-new settlement was across the river from the settlement of Fort Pierre, and near what became an important railroad crossing of the river.

== History ==
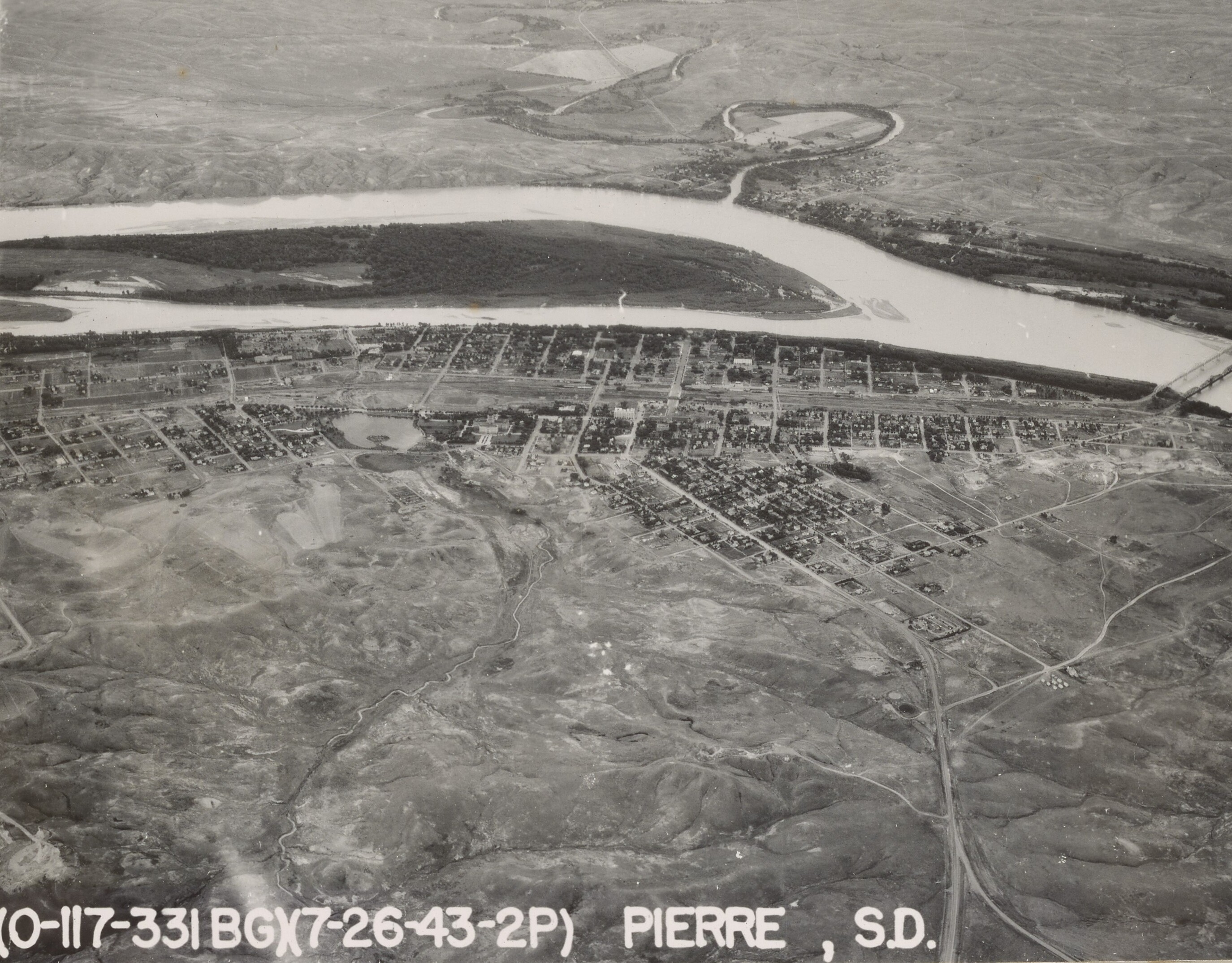
Pierre in 1943

Pierre was founded in 1880 on the east bank of the Missouri River opposite Fort Pierre, a former trading post that developed as a community. It was designated as the state capital when South Dakota gained statehood on November 2, 1889.

Numerous cities, namely Huron, Sioux Falls, Mitchell, and Watertown, challenged the city to be selected as the capital, but Pierre was selected for its geographic centrality in the state. Fort Pierre had developed earlier, with a permanent settlement since c. 1817 around a fur trading post. Fort Pierre Chouteau, preceding the city, was named after Pierre Chouteau, Jr., an American fur trader from St. Louis, Missouri, who was of colonial French origin.

Pierre's development was also influenced by construction of the Rapid City, Pierre and Eastern Railroad, which runs east–west through the city. It increased access to markets for regional products and improved transportation for passengers. The railroad crosses the Missouri River on the Chicago and North Western Railroad Bridge.

The capital city became relatively isolated in the post-World War II era of federally subsidized highway construction, as travelers and freight companies began to use automobiles and trucking. It is one of four state capitals not served by the Interstate Highway System.

== Geography ==
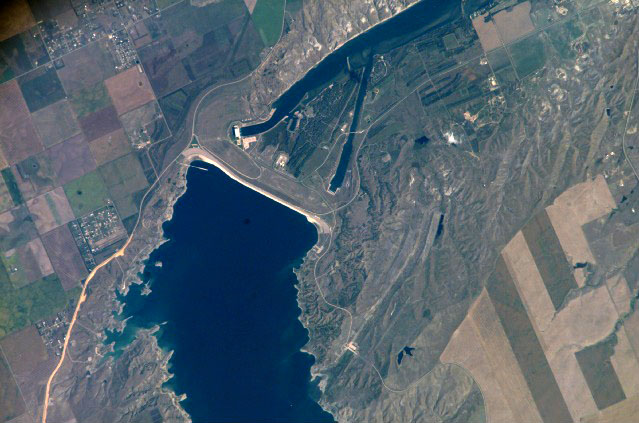
Photograph of the Oahe Dam, several miles north of Pierre, taken from the International Space Station (ISS)

According to the United States Census Bureau, the city has an area of 13.07 square miles (33.85 km^{2}), of which 13.06 square miles (33.83 km^{2}) is land and 0.01 square miles (0.03 km^{2}) is water.

Pierre is sited on rough river bluffs above the east bank of the Missouri River, overlooking its expanse. It is a few miles away from Lake Oahe, one of the world's largest man-made lakes. Developed for flood control and irrigation, the lake has become a popular fishing destination.

=== Climate ===
Pierre has a relatively dry, four-season, humid continental climate (Köppen: Dfa, Trewartha: Dcao), with long, dry, cold winters, hot summers, and brief spring and autumnal transitions; like much of the southern half of the state, it lies in USDA Plant Hardiness zone 5. According to weather maps and their data, Pierre can be considered a cool semi-arid climate (Köppen: BSk) aided by its precipitation near the threshold that reaches even northeast of the city in South Dakota. As such, it is the only capital of the Midwest states with a non-humid climate. The monthly daily average temperature ranges from 19.1 °F (−7.2 °C) in January to 74.9 °F (23.8 °C), though the diurnal temperature variation is significantly greater during summer than in winter. Snow primarily falls in light amounts, with the snowiest months being February and March, while the average seasonal total is 37.2 inches (0.94 m). In addition, there are an average 20.9 nights per year with lows below 0 °F (−17.8 °C), and cold conditions are often intensified by the Great Plains' high winds. Summers often see spikes in temperature, with 6.6 days of highs above 100 °F (37.8 °C) and 37–38 days with highs above 90 °F (32.2 °C).

Climate chart for Pierre

On July 23, 1973, an F3 tornado struck Pierre and caused 10 injuries. It was the strongest tornado ever recorded in Hughes County.

The beginnings of May and October see the last and first freezing nights, respectively, of the cooler season. Precipitation is much lighter in the winter than in late spring and summer, and totals about 20 inches (508 mm) annually. Extremes have ranged from −35 °F (−37 °C) on February 9, 1994, to 117 °F (47 °C) on July 15, 2006.

Climate data for Pierre, South Dakota (Pierre Regional Airport), 1991−2010 normals, extremes 1933–present
Month	Jan	Feb	Mar	Apr	May	Jun	Jul	Aug	Sep	Oct	Nov	Dec	Year
Record high °F (°C)	68 (20)	75 (24)	88 (31)	98 (37)	105 (41)	112 (44)	117 (47)	114 (46)	108 (42)	98 (37)	87 (31)	77 (25)	117 (47)
Mean maximum °F (°C)	52.5 (11.4)	58.2 (14.6)	74.0 (23.3)	84.3 (29.1)	89.8 (32.1)	96.6 (35.9)	103.0 (39.4)	101.9 (38.8)	97.5 (36.4)	86.1 (30.1)	69.1 (20.6)	54.5 (12.5)	105.0 (40.6)
Mean daily maximum °F (°C)	29.0 (−1.7)	33.7 (0.9)	45.7 (7.6)	58.5 (14.7)	69.5 (20.8)	80.0 (26.7)	88.3 (31.3)	86.6 (30.3)	77.5 (25.3)	60.7 (15.9)	44.9 (7.2)	32.4 (0.2)	58.9 (14.9)
Daily mean °F (°C)	19.1 (−7.2)	23.2 (−4.9)	34.3 (1.3)	45.9 (7.7)	57.2 (14.0)	67.8 (19.9)	74.9 (23.8)	73.0 (22.8)	63.6 (17.6)	48.5 (9.2)	34.1 (1.2)	22.8 (−5.1)	47.0 (8.3)
Mean daily minimum °F (°C)	9.3 (−12.6)	12.6 (−10.8)	22.9 (−5.1)	33.3 (0.7)	44.9 (7.2)	55.6 (13.1)	61.6 (16.4)	59.4 (15.2)	49.7 (9.8)	36.2 (2.3)	23.2 (−4.9)	13.2 (−10.4)	35.2 (1.8)
Mean minimum °F (°C)	−13.6 (−25.3)	−8.8 (−22.7)	−0.2 (−17.9)	17.2 (−8.2)	30.2 (−1.0)	43.9 (6.6)	50.5 (10.3)	47.4 (8.6)	33.4 (0.8)	18.9 (−7.3)	5.3 (−14.8)	−8.0 (−22.2)	−18.8 (−28.2)
Record low °F (°C)	−33 (−36)	−35 (−37)	−20 (−29)	0 (−18)	21 (−6)	34 (1)	42 (6)	39 (4)	21 (−6)	2 (−17)	−18 (−28)	−31 (−35)	−35 (−37)
Average precipitation inches (mm)	0.45 (11)	0.74 (19)	0.96 (24)	1.93 (49)	3.25 (83)	3.69 (94)	2.39 (61)	1.95 (50)	1.74 (44)	1.69 (43)	0.77 (20)	0.64 (16)	20.20 (513)
Average snowfall inches (cm)	5.1 (13)	8.0 (20)	5.0 (13)	5.3 (13)	0.0 (0.0)	0.0 (0.0)	0.0 (0.0)	0.0 (0.0)	0.0 (0.0)	1.3 (3.3)	6.3 (16)	6.2 (16)	37.2 (94)
Average precipitation days (≥ 0.01 in)	5.9	5.8	5.6	8.7	11.0	11.4	9.1	7.9	6.4	6.8	5.3	5.6	89.5
Average snowy days (≥ 0.1 in)	5.6	5.3	3.3	2.0	0.0	0.0	0.0	0.0	0.0	0.7	3.9	5.2	26.0
Source: NOAA

See or edit raw graph data.

== Demographics ==
Historical population
Census	Pop.	Note	%±
1890	3,235		—
1900	2,306		−28.7%
1910	3,656		58.5%
1920	3,209		−12.2%
1930	3,659		14.0%
1940	4,322		18.1%
1950	5,715		32.2%
1960	10,088		76.5%
1970	9,699		−3.9%
1980	11,973		23.4%
1990	12,906		7.8%
2000	13,876		7.5%
2010	13,646		−1.7%
2020	14,091		3.3%
U.S. Decennial Census; 2018 Estimate

Pierre is the principal city of the Pierre micropolitan area, which includes all of Hughes and Stanley counties.

=== 2020 census ===
As of the 2020 census, Pierre had a population of 14,091. The median age was 38.5 years, 23.4% of residents were under the age of 18, and 17.7% of residents were 65 years of age or older. For every 100 females there were 89.9 males, and for every 100 females age 18 and over there were 86.2 males age 18 and over.

88.7% of residents lived in urban areas, while 11.3% lived in rural areas.

There were 5,852 households in Pierre, of which 27.4% had children under the age of 18 living in them. Of all households, 43.9% were married-couple households, 20.2% were households with a male householder and no spouse or partner present, and 27.9% were households with a female householder and no spouse or partner present. About 35.2% of all households were made up of individuals and 13.6% had someone living alone who was 65 years of age or older.

There were 6,364 housing units, of which 8.0% were vacant. The homeowner vacancy rate was 1.3% and the rental vacancy rate was 8.9%.

Racial composition as of the 2020 census
Race	Number	Percent
White	11,102	78.8%
Black or African American	83	0.6%
American Indian and Alaska Native	1,798	12.8%
Asian	120	0.9%
Native Hawaiian and Other Pacific Islander	4	0.0%
Some other race	142	1.0%
Two or more races	842	6.0%
Hispanic or Latino (of any race)	417	3.0%

=== 2010 census ===
As of the census of 2010, there were 13,646 people, 5,778 households, and 3,463 families living in the city. The population density was 1,044.9 inhabitants per square mile (403.4/km^{2}). There were 6,159 housing units at an average density of 471.6 per square mile (182.1/km^{2}). The racial makeup of the city was 85.1% White, 0.5% African American, 10.9% Native American, 0.6% Asian, 0.5% from other races, and 2.4% from two or more races. Hispanic or Latino people of any race were 1.9% of the population.

There were 5,778 households, of which 29.2% had children under the age of 18 living with them, 45.7% were married couples living together, 10.4% had a female householder with no husband present, 3.8% had a male householder with no wife present, and 40.1% were non-families. 35.0% of all households were made up of individuals, and 11% had someone living alone who was 65 years of age or older. The average household size was 2.23 and the average family size was 2.87.

The median age in the city was 39.3 years. 22.9% of residents were under the age of 18; 7.5% were between the ages of 18 and 24; 26.7% were from 25 to 44; 28.9% were from 45 to 64; and 13.9% were 65 years of age or older. The gender makeup of the city was 47.8% male and 52.2% female.

=== 2000 census ===
As of the census of 2000, there were 13,876 people, 5,567 households, and 3,574 families living in the city. The population density was 1,065.8 people per square mile (411.5 people/km^{2}). There were 5,949 housing units at an average density of 457.0 per square mile (176.4/km^{2}). The racial makeup of the city was 88.91% White, 0.20% African American, 8.56% Native American, 0.46% Asian, 0.02% Pacific Islander, 0.29% from other races, and 1.56% from two or more races. Hispanics or Latinos of any race were 1.25% of the population.

There were 5,567 households, out of which 32.9% had children under the age of 18 living with them, 51.6% were married couples living together, 9.5% had a female householder with no husband present, and 35.8% were non-families. 31.5% of all households were made up of individuals, and 10.7% had someone living alone who was 65 years of age or older. The average household size was 2.35, and the average family size was 2.96.

In the city, the population was spread out, with 27.2% under the age of 18, 6.5% from 18 to 24, 28.6% from 25 to 44, 23.6% from 45 to 64, and 14.1% who were 65 years of age or older. The median age was 38 years. For every 100 females, there were 90.5 males. For every 100 females age 18 and over, there were 85.4 males.

As of 2000 the median income for a household in the city was $42,962, and the median income for a family was $52,144. Males had a median income of $32,969 versus $22,865 for females. The per capita income for the city was $20,462. About 5.5% of families and 7.8% of the population were below the poverty line, including 7.9% of those under age 18 and 9.2% of those age 65 or over.

== Education ==
The Pierre School District, the school district covering the city, oversees three elementary schools, a middle school and a high school, T. F. Riggs High School. St. Joseph is a private Catholic elementary school. It is administered by the local parish and the Diocese of Sioux Falls. Other schools include For His Glory and the Pierre Indian Learning Center (a tribal school affiliated with the Bureau of Indian Education).

== Media ==
=== Television ===
Television
Channel (Digital)	Callsign
7.1	K14IO-D
11.1	KPLO-LD
11.2	KPLO-LD
13.1	KPRY
13.2	KPRY
13.3	KPRY
34.1	K34GM-D
46.1	K27HJ-D
46.2	K27HJ-D

=== AM radio ===
AM radio stations
Frequency	Call sign
1060 AM	KGFX
1240 AM	KCCR

=== FM radio ===
FM radio stations
Frequency	Call sign
89.1 FM	KVFL
89.5 FM	K208FM
90.3 FM	KSLP
91.7 FM	KTSD
92.7 FM	KGFX-FM
94.5 FM	KPLO-FM
95.3 FM	KLXS
96.3 FM	K242CH
98.9 FM	K255DE
100.1 FM	KJBI
100.5 FM	K263AW
104.5 FM	KCCR-FM
105.1 FM	KPGN-LP
107.1 FM	K296FI

=== Newspaper ===
The Capital Journal is the local newspaper and has been in circulation since 1881. OaheTV is the local public/education/government cable channel serving Pierre, Fort Pierre on Midcontinent Communications Cable.

== Infrastructure ==
=== Transportation ===
Public transit is provided by River Cities Public Transit.

Pierre Regional Airport is served by one commercial airline.

Although in the center of the state, Pierre is one of only four state capitals not served by an Interstate highway (along with Dover, Delaware, Jefferson City, Missouri, and Juneau, Alaska). It is the only one that is not served by any freeways. The nearest Interstate highway is Interstate 90, about 34 mi (55 km) south of Pierre via the four-lane U.S. Highway 83.

The Rapid City, Pierre and Eastern Railroad runs east–west through the city. The railroad crosses the Missouri River on the Chicago and North Western Railroad Bridge.

== Notable people ==
- Lincoln Kienholz, Louisville Cardinals football quarterback
- Angela Aames, actress
- Grey Zabel, National Football League 18th overall draft pick 2025
- Floyd Bannister, Major League Baseball player
- Joseph Bottum, writer
- Dan Davis, writer and former fugitive
- Robert Gleckler, actor
- Dusty Johnson, U.S. representative from South Dakota
- Byron S. Payne, Attorney General of South Dakota
- Rex Robbins, actor
- Mike Rounds, U.S. senator from South Dakota and former governor of South Dakota (resident of Fort Pierre).
- John Thune, U.S. senator from South Dakota

== In popular culture ==
In 2015, in honor of the 80th anniversary of the Monopoly board game, Hasbro held an online vote to determine which cities should be included in an updated version of the "Here and Now: The US Edition" of the game. The top "Boardwalk" spot went to an unexpected contender: Pierre. It received the most votes, beating New York, Los Angeles, Chicago, and Boston. The outcome may have been influenced by the image that accompanied the name of the city in the balloting: the well-known Mount Rushmore, which is 150 miles west of Pierre, in Keystone and the Black Hills section of the state.
