= Statewide opinion polling for the 2004 United States presidential election =

This article provides a collection of statewide public opinion polls that were conducted relating to the 2004 United States presidential election. All candidates involved in polling are John Kerry, against incumbent President George W. Bush, with third-party candidates Ralph Nader (Independent), Michael Badnarik (Libertarian), David Cobb (Green), and Michael Peroutka (Constitution). Additional third-party candidates were on the Minnesota presidential ballot.

== Opinion polling ==
=== Alabama ===
9 electoral votes
(Republican in 1996)
(Republican in 2000)

Poll Source	Date administered (2004)	John Kerry	George W. Bush	Margin	Sample size	Margin of error
Rasmussen Reports/Pulse Opinion Research	October 21–30	42%	53%	11	Not reported	±5%
WKRG-TV Mobile/SurveyUSA	October 25–27	39%	57%	18	634 LV	±4%
Rasmussen Reports/Pulse Opinion Research	October 6–20	41%	53%	12	Not reported	±5%
WKRG-TV Mobile/SurveyUSA	October 1–3	34%	62%	28	600 LV	±4%
Rasmussen Reports/Pulse Opinion Research	September 15–28	40%	56%	16	Not reported	±5%
American Research Group	September 13–16	40%	54%	14	600 LV	±4%
Rasmussen Reports/Pulse Opinion Research	September 3–14	42%	53%	11	416 LV	±5%
Alabama Education Association/Capital Survey Research Center	August 30–31	34%	54%	20	482 LV	Not reported
Rasmussen Reports/Pulse Opinion Research	August 1–26	42%	53%	11	500 LV	±5%
WKRG-TV Mobile/SurveyUSA	August 21–23	37%	58%	21	599 LV	±4.1%
Alabama Education Association/Capital Survey Research Center	July 22–28	34%	56%	22	590 LV	Not reported
Rasmussen Reports/Pulse Opinion Research	June 1–30	38%	52%	14	Not reported	±5%
Rasmussen Reports/Pulse Opinion Research	May 1–31	36%	57%	21	Not reported	±5%
Alabama Education Association/Capital Survey Research Center	May 4–6, 17–20	37%	56%	19	785 RV	±3.5%
Mobile Register/University of South Alabama	May 10–13	35%	55%	20	400 RV	±5%
WKRG-TV Mobile/SurveyUSA	May 1–3	36%	55%	19	743 LV	±3.7%
University of South Alabama	March 15–18	27%	59%	32	405 A	±5%

Three-way race

Poll Source	Date administered (2004)	John Kerry	George W. Bush	Ralph Nader	Margin	Sample size	Margin of error
Alabama Education Association/Capital Survey Research Center	October 11–13	32%	56%	1%	24	546 LV	±4%
Mobile Register/University of South Alabama	September 27–30	22%	59%	1%	37	519 LV	±4.3%
Alabama Education Association/Capital Survey Research Center	August 9–12	34%	51%	1%	17	Not reported	Not reported
Mobile Register/University of South Alabama	May 10–13	29%	54%	5%	25	400 RV	±5%

=== Alaska ===
3 electoral votes
(Republican in 1996)
(Republican in 2000)

Three-way race

Poll Source	Date administered (2004)	John Kerry	George W. Bush	Ralph Nader	Margin	Sample size	Margin of error
American Research Group	September 9–11	30%	57%	5%	27	600 LV	±4%
Dittman Research	June 23–30	33%	56%	5%	23	511 RV	±4%

=== Arizona ===
10 electoral votes
(Democrat in 1996)
(Republican in 2000)

Poll Source	Date administered (2004)	John Kerry	George W. Bush	Margin	Sample size	Margin of error
KVOA-TV Tucson/KPNX-TV Phoenix/SurveyUSA	October 28–30	41%	56%	15	599 LV	±4.1%
Rasmussen Reports/Pulse Opinion Research	October 26	45%	50%	5	500 LV	±4.5%
The Arizona Republic/Market Solutions Group	October 18–19	40%	47%	7	600 LV	±4%
KVOA-TV Tucson/KPNX-TV Phoenix/SurveyUSA	October 17–19	43%	54%	11	616 LV	±4%
Zogby Interactive	October 15–18	47%	50%	3	Not reported	Not reported
Northern Arizona University	October 7–11	44%	49%	5	401 LV	±5%
KVOA-TV Tucson/KPNX-TV Phoenix/SurveyUSA	October 5–7	41%	55%	14	599 LV	±4.1%
Zogby Interactive	October 2–5	47%	50%	3	Not reported	Not reported
The Arizona Republic/Market Solutions Group	October 2–4	38%	48%	10	601 LV	±4%
SurveyUSA	September 27–29	44%	53%	9	Not reported	Not reported
KVOA-TV Tucson/KPNX-TV Phoenix/SurveyUSA	September 21–23	43%	54%	11	631 LV	±4%
Bradenton.com/Mason-Dixon Polling & Research	September 13–14	39%	50%	11	625 LV	±4%
The Arizona Republic/Market Solutions Group	September 3–5	38%	54%	16	600 LV	±4%
KAET-TV-Phoenix/Channel 8/Arizona State University	August 19–22	39%	47%	8	400 RV	±4.9%
The Arizona Republic/Market Solutions Group	July 30–August 1	45%	48%	3	601 LV	±4%
KAET-TV-Phoenix/Channel 8/Arizona State University	July 15–17	42%	41%	1	Not reported	±5%
KVOA-TV Tucson/KPNX-TV Phoenix/SurveyUSA	July 12–14	41%	53%	12	767 LV	±3.6%
Behavior Research Center (Rocky Mountain Poll)	June 30–July 7	36%	46%	10	Not reported	Not reported
Republican National Committee/Public Opinion Strategies (R)	June 1–6	45.3%	48.3%	3	800 LV	±3.46%
Behavior Research Center (Rocky Mountain Poll)	April 29–May 4	42%	46%	4	555 RV	±4.2%
KAET-TV-Phoenix/Channel 8/Arizona State University	April 23–26	38%	41%	3	410 RV	±4.8%
KVOA-TV Tucson/KPNX-TV Phoenix/SurveyUSA	March 17–18	42%	51%	9	634 LV	±4%
KAET-TV-Phoenix/Channel 8/Arizona State University	February 19–22	46%	44%	2	430 RV	±4.7%
KVOA-TV Tucson/KPNX-TV Phoenix/SurveyUSA	February 18–19	44%	52%	8	534 RV	±4.3%
Behavior Research Center (Rocky Mountain Poll)	January 6–12	38%	48%	10	704 A	±3.7%
KAET-TV-Phoenix/Channel 8/Arizona State University	November 14–17, 2003	33%	51%	18	Not reported	Not reported

Three-way race

Poll Source	Date administered (2004)	John Kerry	George W. Bush	Ralph Nader	Michael Badnarik	Margin	Sample size	Margin of error
KAET-TV-Phoenix/Channel 8/Arizona State University	October 19–21	42%	49%	N/A	1%	7	Not reported	Not reported
KAET-TV-Phoenix/Channel 8/Arizona State University	September 23–26	38%	53%	N/A	1%	15	Not reported	Not reported
Zogby Interactive	September 13–17	48%	49%	3%	N/A	1	Not reported	Not reported
American Research Group	September 11–14	43%	49%	1%	N/A	6	600 LV	±4%
KAET-TV-Phoenix/Channel 8/Arizona State University	June 24–27	35%	47%	2%	N/A	12	400 RV	±4.9%
The Arizona Republic/Market Solutions Group	June 10–13	41%	44%	2%	N/A	3	600 RV	±4%
KAET-TV-Phoenix/Channel 8/Arizona State University	May 20–23	38%	43%	2%	N/A	5	377 RV	±5.1%
Behavior Research Center (Rocky Mountain Poll)	April 29–May 4	37%	45%	7%	N/A	8	555 RV	±4.2%

=== Arkansas ===
6 electoral votes
(Democrat in 1996)
(Republican in 2000)

Poll Source	Date administered (2004)	John Kerry	George W. Bush	Margin	Sample size	Margin of error
KTHV-TV Little Rock/SurveyUSA	October 30–November 1	46%	51%	5	550 LV	±4.3%
MSNBC/Knight-Ridder/Mason-Dixon Polling & Research	October 27–29	43%	51%	8	625 LV	±4%
KTHV-TV Little Rock/SurveyUSA	October 23–25	45%	51%	6	649 LV	±3.9%
KTHV-TV Little Rock/SurveyUSA	October 15–17	46%	51%	5	617 LV	±4%
Rasmussen Reports/Pulse Opinion Research	October 11	45%	51%	6	Not reported	±5%
SurveyUSA	October 1–3	44%	53%	9	Not reported	Not reported
KTHV-TV Little Rock/SurveyUSA	September 27–29	44%	53%	9	579 LV	±4.2%
Rasmussen Reports/Pulse Opinion Research	September 12–25	44%	51%	7	500 LV	±5%
Rasmussen Reports/Pulse Opinion Research	August 1–26	43%	49%	6	Not reported	±5%
KTHV-TV Little Rock/SurveyUSA	August 20–22	47%	48%	1	567 LV	±4.2%
Rasmussen Reports/Pulse Opinion Research	July 1–31	46%	46%	Tied	Not reported	±5%
KTHV-TV Little Rock/SurveyUSA	July 6–8	47%	49%	2	546 LV	±4.3%
Rasmussen Reports/Pulse Opinion Research	June 1–30	46%	45%	1	Not reported	±5%
Republican National Committee/Public Opinion Strategies (R)	June 1–6	43.8%	49.5%	5.7	800 LV	±3.46%
Rasmussen Reports/Pulse Opinion Research	May 1–31	43%	48%	5	Not reported	±5%
Rasmussen Reports/Pulse Opinion Research	May 2	45%	45%	Tied	500 LV	±4.5%
KTHV-TV Little Rock/SurveyUSA	April 14–15	45%	47%	2	565 LV	±4.2%
Arkansas State University	March 1–April 8	43%	51%	8	418 A	±5%

Three-way race

Poll Source	Date administered (2004)	John Kerry	George W. Bush	Ralph Nader	Margin	Sample size	Margin of error
Wall Street Journal/Zogby Interactive	October 25–30	46.9%	50.1%	0.5%	3.2	620 LV	±3.9%
Arkansas News Bureau/Stephens Media Group/Opinion Research Associates	October 18–20	48%	48%	1%	Tied	500 LV	±4.5%
University of Arkansas	October 5–20	44%	53%	2%	9	618 LV	±3.5%
Wall Street Journal/Zogby Interactive	October 13–18	48.4%	49.7%	0.2%	1.3	516 LV	±4.3%
Arkansas Democrat-Gazette/Zogby International	October 10–11	44.6%	46.2%	2%	1.6	503 LV	±4.5%
Arkansas News Bureau/Stephens Media Group/Opinion Research Associates	October 4–6	43%	52%	1%	9	502 LV	±4.5%
Wall Street Journal/Zogby Interactive	September 30–October 5	46.9%	46.7%	0.7%	0.2	545 LV	±3.6%
American Research Group	September 15–17	45%	48%	2%	3	600 LV	±4%
Wall Street Journal/Zogby Interactive	September 13–17	46.6%	46.5%	2.2%	0.1	582 LV	±4.1%
Wall Street Journal/Zogby Interactive	August 30–September 3	45.9%	47.6%	0.6%	1.7	574 LV	±4.1%
Wall Street Journal/Zogby Interactive	August 16–21	48.2%	45.6%	0.8%	2.6	508 LV	±4.4%
Wall Street Journal/Zogby Interactive	July 26–30	46.4%	47.9%	0.5%	1.5	503 LV	±4.4%
Wall Street Journal/Zogby Interactive	July 19–23	44.6%	47.4%	2%	2.8	512 LV	±4.3%
Wall Street Journal/Zogby Interactive	July 6–10	44.5%	46.7%	4.4%	2.2	508 LV	±4.4%
Wall Street Journal/Zogby Interactive	June 15–20	46.8%	44.7%	2.1%	2.1	505 LV	±4.4%
Wall Street Journal/Zogby Interactive	June 1–6	43.5%	51.2%	1.6%	7.7	699 LV	±3.7%
Wall Street Journal/Zogby Interactive	May 18–23	44.5%	49.3%	1.2%	4.8	497 LV	±4.5%
Rasmussen Reports/Pulse Opinion Research	May 2	45%	45%	0%	Tied	500 LV	±4.5%

=== California ===
55 electoral votes
(Democrat in 1996)
(Democrat in 2000)

Poll Source	Date administered (2004)	John Kerry	George W. Bush	Margin	Sample size	Margin of error
KABC-TV Los Angeles/KPIX-TV San Francisco/KXTV-TV Sacramento/KGTV-TV San Diego/SurveyUSA	October 29–31	54%	43%	11	767 LV	±3.6%
Rasmussen Reports/Pulse Opinion Research	October 17–30	53%	43%	10	Not reported	±3%
Field Research Corporation (Field Poll)	October 21–27	49%	42%	7	1,086 LV	±3.2%
KABC-TV Los Angeles/KPIX-TV San Francisco/KXTV-TV Sacramento/KGTV-TV San Diego/SurveyUSA	October 23–25	53%	44%	9	743 LV	±3.7%
Los Angeles Times	October 14–18	58%	40%	18	925 LV	±3%
KABC-TV Los Angeles/KPIX-TV San Francisco/KXTV-TV Sacramento/KGTV-TV San Diego/SurveyUSA	October 15–17	53%	43%	10	703 LV	±3.8%
Rasmussen Reports/Pulse Opinion Research	October 5–11	51%	43%	8	Not reported	±3%
Rasmussen Reports/Pulse Opinion Research	September 29–October 5	53%	42%	11	864 LV	±4%
KABC-TV Los Angeles/KPIX-TV San Francisco/KXTV-TV Sacramento/KGTV-TV San Diego/SurveyUSA	October 2–4	51%	43%	8	748 LV	±3.7%
Field Research Corporation (Field Poll)	September 30–October 3	49%	40%	9	586 LV	±4.3%
San José State University	September 27–October 1	48%	42%	6	600 LV	±4%
Field Research Corporation (Field Poll)	September 24–29	49%	41%	8	549 LV	±4.3%
Rasmussen Reports/Pulse Opinion Research	September 19–25	53%	40%	13	848 LV	±4%
Los Angeles Times	September 17–21	55%	40%	15	861 LV	±3%
Public Policy Institute of California	September 12–19	51%	39%	12	1,151 LV	±3%
Rasmussen Reports/Pulse Opinion Research	September 11–17	55%	39%	16	Not reported	±3%
American Research Group	September 11–13	52%	41%	11	600 LV	±4%
KABC-TV Los Angeles/KPIX-TV San Francisco/KXTV-TV Sacramento/KGTV-TV San Diego/SurveyUSA	September 6–8	52%	42%	10	598 LV	±4.1%
Rasmussen Reports/Pulse Opinion Research	August 27–September 3	50%	42%	8	608 LV	±4%
Rasmussen Reports/Pulse Opinion Research	August 16–26	51%	42%	9	654 LV	Not reported
KABC-TV Los Angeles/KPIX-TV San Francisco/KXTV-TV Sacramento/KGTV-TV San Diego/SurveyUSA	August 16–18	49%	46%	3	589 LV	±4.1%
Public Policy Institute of California	August 4–11	54%	38%	16	1,117 LV	±3%
Field Research Corporation (Field Poll)	July 30–August 4	53%	41%	12	633 LV	±4.1%
Rasmussen Reports/Pulse Opinion Research	July 1–31	55%	37%	18	Not reported	±3%
San José State University	June 28–July 2	50%	39%	11	608 LV	±4%
Rasmussen Reports/Pulse Opinion Research	June 1–30	52%	38%	14	Not reported	±3%
Rasmussen Reports/Pulse Opinion Research	May 1–31	49%	41%	8	Not reported	±3%
Field Research Corporation (Field Poll)	May 18–24	55%	40%	15	647 RV	±4%
KABC-TV Los Angeles/KPIX-TV San Francisco/KXTV-TV Sacramento/KGTV-TV San Diego/SurveyUSA	May 4–6	46%	45%	1	635 LV	±4%
Rasmussen Reports/Pulse Opinion Research	April 17–24	51%	40%	11	502 LV	±5%
Los Angeles Times	April 17–21	53%	41%	12	1,265 RV	±3%
Rasmussen Reports/Pulse Opinion Research	March 5–11	53%	44%	9	445 LV	±5%
Field Research Corporation (Field Poll)	February 18–22	53%	41%	12	958 RV	±3.3%
Los Angeles Times	February 18–22	53%	40%	13	560 LV	±4%
Field Research Corporation (Field Poll)	January 5–13	39%	48%	9	929 RV	±3.4%
Field Research Corporation (Field Poll)	September 25–October 1, 2003	42%	46%	4	Not reported	±4.5%
Field Research Corporation (Field Poll)	September 3–7, 2003	42%	45%	3	649 RV	±4.0%

Three-way race

Poll Source	Date administered (2004)	John Kerry	George W. Bush	Ralph Nader	Margin	Sample size	Margin of error
Los Angeles Times	September 17–21	53%	40%	2%	13	861 LV	±3%
Field Research Corporation (Field Poll)	July 30–August 4	51%	40%	2%	11	633 LV	±4.1%
KABC-TV Los Angeles/KPIX-TV San Francisco/KXTV-TV Sacramento/KGTV-TV San Diego/SurveyUSA	July 23–25	53%	41%	3%	12	711 LV	±3.8%
Public Policy Institute of California	June 30–July 14	49%	38%	5%	11	1,378 LV	±2.7%
San José State University	June 28–July 2	46%	38%	7%	8	608 LV	±4%
Field Research Corporation (Field Poll)	May 18–24	51%	39%	4%	12	647 RV	±4%
Los Angeles Times	April 17–21	49%	39%	6%	10	1,265 RV	±3%

=== Colorado ===
9 electoral votes
(Republican in 1996)
(Republican in 2000)

Poll Source	Date administered (2004)	John Kerry	George W. Bush	Margin	Sample size	Margin of error
KUSA-TV Denver/SurveyUSA	October 30–November 1	47%	50%	3	705 LV	±3.8%
Zogby International (Daily Tracking)	October 29–November 1	47%	49%	2	601 LV	±4.1%
KUSA-TV Denver/KOAA-TV Colorado Springs/SurveyUSA	October 28–30	46%	52%	6	626 LV	±4%
Zogby International (Daily Tracking)	October 25–28	48%	47%	1	601 LV	±4.1%
Rocky Mountain News/News 4/Public Opinion Strategies	October 25–27	42%	51%	9	500 LV	±4.3%
Zogby International (Daily Tracking)	October 21–24	49%	45%	4	602 LV	±4.1%
League of Conservation Voters/Fairbank, Maslin & Associates (D)	October 15–21	48%	48%	Tied	400 LV	±4.9%
KUSA-TV Denver/KOAA-TV Colorado Springs/SurveyUSA	October 18–20	45%	52%	7	597 LV	±4.1%
The Pueblo Chieftain/Ciruli Associates	October 15–19	43%	50%	7	600 LV	±4%
Zogby Interactive	October 13–18	48%	49%	1	Not reported	Not reported
USA Today/CNN/Gallup	October 14–17	46%	51%	5	666 LV	±4%
KUSA-TV Denver/KOAA-TV Colorado Springs/SurveyUSA	October 5–7	44%	52%	8	598 LV	±4.1%
Denver Post/Mason-Dixon Polling & Research	October 4–6	41%	50%	9	630 LV	±4%
USA Today/CNN/Gallup	October 3–6	49%	49%	Tied	667 LV	±5%
Zogby Interactive	October 2–6	49%	48%	1	Not reported	Not reported
KUSA-TV Denver/KOAA-TV Colorado Springs/SurveyUSA	September 21–23	44%	52%	8	626 LV	±4%
The Pueblo Chieftain/Ciruli Associates	September 14–18	39%	51%	12	600 LV	±4%
Rasmussen Reports/Pulse Opinion Research	August 19	47%	47%	Tied	500 LV	±4.5%
KUSA-TV Denver/KOAA-TV Colorado Springs/SurveyUSA	August 14–16	47%	47%	Tied	622 LV	±4%
Denver Post/Mason-Dixon Polling & Strategy	June 15–18	43%	48%	5	Not reported	Not reported
Rasmussen Reports/Pulse Opinion Research	April 14	44%	49%	5	500 LV	±4.5%

Three-way race

Poll Source	Date administered (2004)	John Kerry	George W. Bush	Ralph Nader	Margin	Sample size	Margin of error
MSNBC/Knight-Ridder/Mason-Dixon Polling & Research	October 27–29	43%	50%	1%	7	625 LV	±4%
The Pueblo Chieftain/Ciruli Associates	October 15–19	42%	48%	2%	6	600 LV	±4%
USA Today/CNN/Gallup	October 14–17	45%	51%	1%	6	666 LV	±4%
MSNBC/Knight-Ridder/Mason-Dixon Polling & Research	October 14–16	43%	49%	1%	6	630 LV	±4%
Rocky Mountain News/News 4/Public Opinion Strategies	October 13–14	42%	47%	3%	5	400 LV	±4.9%
USA Today/CNN/Gallup	October 3–6	49%	49%	1%	Tied	667 LV	±5%
The Pueblo Chieftain/Ciruli Associates	September 14–18	38%	50%	3%	12	600 LV	±4%
Zogby Interactive	September 13–17	48%	49%	3%	1	Not reported	Not reported
Rocky Mountain News/News 4/Public Opinion Strategies	September 12–13	44%	45%	3%	1	500 LV	±4.3%
American Research Group	September 10–13	45%	46%	3%	1	600 LV	±4%
Rocky Mountain News/News 4/Public Opinion Strategies	March 31–April 1	40%	49%	4%	9	400 LV	±4.9%
Schaffer for Senate/McLaughlin & Associates (R)	March 15–16	42%	46%	4%	4	500 LV	±4.5%

Six-way race

Poll Source	Date administered (2004)	John Kerry	George W. Bush	Ralph Nader	David Cobb	Michael Badnarik	Michael Peroutka	Margin	Sample size	Margin of error
Rasmussen Reports/Pulse Opinion Research	October 18	45%	50%	2%	0%	1%	0%	5	500 LV	±4.5%
Rasmussen Reports/Pulse Opinion Research	September 29	44%	48%	3%	1%	1%	0%	4	500 LV	±4.5%
Rasmussen Reports/Pulse Opinion Research	September 16	45%	46%	3%	1%	2%	1%	1	500 LV	±4.5%

=== Connecticut ===
7 electoral votes
(Democrat in 1996)
(Democrat in 2000)

Poll Source	Date administered (2004)	John Kerry	George W. Bush	Margin	Sample size	Margin of error
Quinnipiac University	September 26–28	51%	44%	7	723 LV	±3.6%
Quinnipiac University	August 12–17	48%	40%	8	1,079 RV	±3%
Quinnipiac University	June 27–28	55%	34%	19	929 RV	±3.2%
Quinnipiac University	May 26–June 1	50%	38%	12	1,350 RV	±2.7%
University of Connecticut	February 26–29	49%	36%	13	448 RV	±4.5%
Quinnipiac University	November 12–18, 2003	47%	46%	1	1,600 RV	±2.5%
Quinnipiac University	October 1–7, 2003	48%	44%	4	1,519 RV	±2.5%
Quinnipiac University	July 23–29, 2003	43%	49%	6	1,384 RV	±2.6%
Quinnipiac University	April 22–28, 2003	37%	54%	17	1,239 RV	±2.8%

Three-way race

Poll Source	Date administered (2004)	John Kerry	George W. Bush	Ralph Nader	Margin	Sample size	Margin of error
Quinnipiac University	September 26–28	50%	44%	2%	6	723 LV	±3.6%
American Research Group	September 12–14	54%	39%	1%	15	600 LV	±4%
Quinnipiac University	August 12–17	45%	38%	6%	7	1,079 RV	±3%
Quinnipiac University	June 27–28	50%	32%	9%	18	929 RV	±3.2%
Quinnipiac University	May 26–June 1	46%	36%	8%	10	1,350 RV	±2.7%
University of Connecticut	April 21–27	51%	33%	4%	18	501 RV	±4%
University of Connecticut	March 22–28	52%	33%	4%	19	511 RV	±4%

=== Delaware ===
3 electoral votes
(Democrat in 1996)
(Democrat in 2000)

Poll Source	Date administered (2004)	John Kerry	George W. Bush	Ralph Nader	Margin	Sample size	Margin of error
WHYY-TV/West Chester University	September 22–25	45.2%	37.6%	0.5%	7.6	590 RV	±3.9%
American Research Group	September 13–15	50%	41%	2%	9	600 LV	±4%

=== District of Columbia ===
3 electoral votes
(Democrat in 1996)
(Democrat in 2000)

Poll Source	Date administered (2004)	John Kerry	George W. Bush	Ralph Nader	Lead Margin	Sample size	Margin of error
American Research Group	September 11–13	78%	11%	6%	67	600 LV	±4%

=== Florida ===
27 electoral votes
(Democrat in 1996)
(Republican in 2000)

Poll Source	Date administered (2004)	John Kerry	George W. Bush	Lead Margin	Sample size	Margin of error
Zogby International (Daily Tracking)	October 29–November 1	48%	48%	Tied	601 LV	±4.1%
WFLA-TV Tampa/WPTV West Palm/WKMG-TV Orlando/WTLV-TV Jacksonville/WFOR Miami/WKRG Pensacola/SurveyUSA	October 29–31	48%	49%	1	742 LV	±3.7%
MSNBC/Knight-Ridder/Mason-Dixon Polling & Research	October 27–29	45%	49%	4	625 LV	±4%
Zogby International (Daily Tracking)	October 25–28	47%	48%	1	601 LV	±4.1%
Rasmussen Reports/Pulse Opinion Research	October 27	45%	50%	5	500 LV	±4%
America Coming Together/Hamilton Beattie (D)	October 25–27	46%	48%	2	Not reported	Not reported
Rasmussen Reports/Pulse Opinion Research (Daily Tracking)	October 20–26	48%	48%	Tied	567 LV	±4%
American Research Group	October 23–25	49%	47%	2	600 LV	±4%
WFLA-TV Tampa/WPTV West Palm/WKMG-TV Orlando/WTLV-TV Jacksonville/WFOR Miami/WKRG Pensacola/SurveyUSA	October 22–24	50%	48%	2	749 LV	±3.7%
Zogby International (Daily Tracking)	October 21–24	46%	49%	3	602 LV	±4.1%
Quinnipiac University	October 15–19	47%	49%	2	808 LV	±3.5%
WFLA-TV Tampa/WPTV West Palm/WKMG-TV Orlando/WTLV-TV Jacksonville/WFOR Miami/WKRG Pensacola/SurveyUSA	October 15–17	50%	49%	1	601 LV	±4.1%
Miami Herald/Mason-Dixon Polling & Research	October 14–16	45%	48%	3	625 LV	±4%
InsiderAdvantage	October 12–14	48%	44%	4	Not reported	Not reported
Rasmussen Reports/Pulse Opinion Research (Daily Tracking)	October 8–14	46%	49%	3	684 LV	±4%
American Research Group	October 2–5	46%	48%	2	600 LV	±4%
Quinnipiac University	October 1–5	44%	51%	7	717 LV	±3.7%
WFLA-TV Tampa/WPTV West Palm/WKMG-TV Orlando/WTLV-TV Jacksonville/WFOR Miami/WKRG Pensacola/SurveyUSA	October 1–3	46%	51%	5	711 LV	±3.8%
Rasmussen Reports/Pulse Opinion Research (Daily Tracking)	September 27–October 3	47%	51%	4	781 LV	±4%
CNN/USA Today/Gallup	September 24–27	43%	53%	10	704 LV	±4%
Rasmussen Reports/Pulse Opinion Research (Daily Tracking)	September 18–24	49%	48%	1	Not reported	±4%
CNN/USA Today/Gallup	September 18–22	47%	49%	2	674 LV	±4%
Quinnipiac University	September 18–21	43%	48%	5	819 RV	±3.4%
Rasmussen Reports/Pulse Opinion Research	September 11–17	47%	48%	1	Not reported	±4%
WFLA-TV Tampa/WPTV West Palm/WKMG-TV Orlando/WTLV-TV Jacksonville/WFOR Miami/WKRG Pensacola/SurveyUSA	September 12–14	45%	51%	6	607 LV	±4.1%
CNN/USA Today/Gallup	August 20–22	47%	48%	1	671 LV	±4%
Quinnipiac University	August 5–10	49%	42%	7	1,094 RV	±3%
American Research Group	August 3–5	52%	44%	8	600 LV	±4%
Rasmussen Reports/Pulse Opinion Research	July 1–31	47%	45%	2	Not reported	±4%
CNN/USA Today/Gallup	July 19–22	47%	50%	3	699 LV	±4%
Los Angeles Times	July 19–21	45%	45%	Tied	729 RV	±4%
Sayfie Review/InsiderAdvantage	July 19–20	46%	46%	Tied	687 RV	±4%
American Research Group	July 13–15	49%	45%	4	600 LV	±4%
WFLA-TV Tampa/WPTV-TV Palm Beach/WKRG-TV Mobile/WKMG-TV Orlando/WTLV-TV Jacksonville/SurveyUSA	July 9–11	47%	44%	3	732 LV	±3.7%
Rasmussen Reports/Pulse Opinion Research	June 1–30	48%	43%	5	Not reported	±4%
Quinnipiac University	June 23–27	46%	44%	2	1,209 RV	±2.8%
Fox News/Opinion Dynamics Corporation	June 22–23	41%	50%	9	750 RV	±4%
American Research Group	June 21–23	48%	46%	2	600 LV	±4%
WFLA-TV Tampa/WPTV-TV Palm Beach/WKRG-TV Mobile/WKMG-TV Orlando/WTLV-TV Jacksonville/SurveyUSA	June 12–14	43%	50%	7	723 LV	±3.7%
Republican National Committee/Public Opinion Strategies (R)	June 1–6	44.3%	49.2%	4.9	1,200 LV	±2.83%
Rasmussen Reports/Pulse Opinion Research	May 1–31	46%	46%	Tied	Not reported	±4%
American Research Group	May 17–19	47%	47%	Tied	600 LV	±4%
America Coming Together/Hamilton Beattie (D)	April 29–May 9	50%	47%	3	1,000 LV	±3%
American Research Group	April 18–21	47%	47%	Tied	600 LV	±4%
Rasmussen Reports/Pulse Opinion Research	April 13	47%	46%	1	500 LV	±4.5%
Tampa Tribune/News Channel 8/Mason-Dixon Polling & Research	March 30–April 1	43%	51%	8	625 RV	±4%
Rasmussen Reports/Pulse Opinion Research	March 1–13	48%	45%	3	400 LV	±5%
St. Petersburg Times/Miami Herald/Schroth, Eldon & Associates/The Polling Company	December 1–3, 2003	38%	51%	13	800 RV	±3.5%
Tampa Tribune/Mason-Dixon Polling & Research	November 17–19, 2003	34%	57%	23	625 RV	Not reported

Three-way race

Poll Source	Date administered (2004)	John Kerry	George W. Bush	Ralph Nader	Margin	Sample size	Margin of error
American Research Group	October 30–November 1	50%	48%	1%	2	600 LV	±4%
Fox News/Opinion Dynamics Corporation	October 30–31	49%	44%	1%	5	700 LV	±4%
InsiderAdvantage	October 29–31	48%	48%	1%	Tied	400 LV	±5%
Quinnipiac University	October 27–31	43%	51%	1%	8	1,098 LV	±3%
CNN/USA Today/Gallup	October 27–30	49%	46%	0%	3	1,138 LV	±4%
New York Times Regional Newspapers/Florida Poll	October 23–27	48.3%	46.7%	1.5%	1.6	802 LV	±3%
Quinnipiac University	October 22–26	46%	49%	1%	3	944 LV	±3.2%
Los Angeles Times	October 22–26	43%	51%	2%	8	510 LV	±4%
American Research Group	October 23–25	46%	49%	1%	3	600 LV	±4%
CNN/USA Today/Gallup	October 21–24	43%	51%	1%	8	601 LV	±4.1%
St. Petersburg Times/Miami Herald/Schroth, Eldon & Associates/The Polling Company Inc.	October 19–21	46%	46%	1%	Tied	800 LV	±3.5%
InsiderAdvantage	October 19–21	46%	46%	2%	Tied	Not reported	Not reported
Quinnipiac University	October 15–19	47%	48%	1%	1	808 LV	±3.5%
Wall Street Journal/Zogby Interactive	October 13–18	48.9%	50.1%	0.3%	1.2	2,131 LV	±2.1%
University of North Florida	October 10–15	45%	44%	2%	1	614 LV	±4%
Univision/Washington Post	October 4–10	48%	48%	1%	Tied	655 LV	±4%
NBC2 News/Mason-Dixon Polling & Research	October 4–5	44%	48%	2%	4	625 LV	±4%
American Research Group	October 2–5	47%	45%	2%	2	600 LV	±4%
Quinnipiac University	October 1–5	44%	51%	0%	7	717 LV	±3.7%
Wall Street Journal/Zogby Interactive	September 30–October 5	49.5%	49.1%	0.5%	0.4	1,925 LV	±2.2%
America Coming Together/Hamilton Beattie (D)	October 1–4	49%	47%	2%	2	800 LV	±3.5%
CNN/USA Today/Gallup	September 24–27	43%	52%	1%	9	704 LV	±4%
CNN/USA Today/Gallup	September 18–22	46%	49%	1%	3	674 LV	±4%
Quinnipiac University	September 18–21	41%	49%	5%	8	819 RV	±3.4%
American Research Group	September 17–20	46%	45%	2%	1	600 LV	±4%
Wall Street Journal/Zogby Interactive	September 13–17	48.1%	47.6%	0.9%	0.5	1,669 LV	±2.4%
Rasmussen Reports/Pulse Opinion Research	September 6–12	47%	48%	1%	1	Not reported	±4%
Wall Street Journal/Zogby Interactive	August 30–September 3	49.4%	49.1%	0.6%	0.3	1,679 LV	±2.4%
CNN/USA Today/Gallup	August 20–22	46%	48%	2%	2	671 LV	±4%
Wall Street Journal/Zogby Interactive	August 16–21	49.6%	49%	0.3%	0.6	1,421 LV	±2.6%
Quinnipiac University	August 5–10	47%	41%	4%	6	1,094 RV	±3%
American Research Group	August 3–5	50%	43%	2%	7	600 LV	±4%
Wall Street Journal/Zogby Interactive	July 26–30	49.5%	46.7%	2%	2.8	1,587 LV	±2.5%
Wall Street Journal/Zogby Interactive	July 19–23	48.4%	48.5%	0.9%	0.1	1,500 LV	±2.5%
CNN/USA Today/Gallup	July 19–22	46%	50%	1%	4	699 LV	±4%
Orlando Sentinel/WESH NewsChannel 2/Mason-Dixon Polling & Research	July 19–21	46%	48%	2%	2	625 LV	±4%
Los Angeles Times	July 19–21	44%	45%	2%	1	729 RV	±4%
American Research Group	July 13–15	47%	44%	3%	3	600 LV	±4%
Wall Street Journal/Zogby Interactive	July 6–10	50.8%	44.2%	2.9%	6.6	1,156 LV	±2.9%
Quinnipiac University	June 23–27	43%	43%	5%	Tied	1,209 RV	±2.8%
Fox News/Opinion Dynamics Corporation	June 22–23	38%	48%	3%	10	750 RV	±4%
American Research Group	June 21–23	47%	46%	2%	1	600 LV	±4%
Rasmussen Reports/Pulse Opinion Research	June 18–22	48%	42%	1%	6	Not reported	±4%
Wall Street Journal/Zogby Interactive	June 15–20	46.1%	50.3%	0.5%	4.2	1,429 LV	±2.6%
Rasmussen Reports/Pulse Opinion Research	June 11–17	48%	44%	1%	4	Not reported	±4%
Wall Street Journal/Zogby Interactive	June 1–6	49.5%	47.9%	0.6%	1.6	1,170 LV	±2.9%
Wall Street Journal/Zogby Interactive	May 18–23	49%	47.6%	1%	1.4	857 LV	±3.4%
American Research Group	May 17–19	46%	47%	3%	1	600 LV	±4%
American Coming Together/Hamilton Beattie (D)	April 29–May 9	48%	46%	3%	2	1,000 LV	±3%
American Research Group	April 18–21	45%	46%	3%	1	600 LV	±4%
American Research Group	March 3–4	45%	44%	4%	1	600 LV	±4%
St. Petersburg Times/Miami Herald/Schroth, Eldon & Associates/The Polling Company	March 3–4	49%	43%	3%	6	800 RV	±3.5%

Five-way race

Poll Source	Date administered (2004)	John Kerry	George W. Bush	Ralph Nader	David Cobb	Michael Badnarik	Margin	Sample size	Margin of error
Badnarik for President/Rasmussen Reports/Pulse Opinion Research (L)	August 24	47%	49%	2%	1%	1%	2	500 LV	±4.5%

=== Georgia ===
15 electoral votes
(Republican in 1996)
(Republican in 2000)

Poll Source	Date administered (2004)	John Kerry	George W. Bush	Margin	Sample size	Margin of error
WXIA-TV Atlanta/SurveyUSA	October 28–30	41%	53%	12	628 LV	±4%
Rasmussen Reports/Pulse Opinion Research	October 24–30	39%	54%	15	Not reported	±5%
Atlanta Journal-Constitution/WSB-TV/Zogby International	October 27–29	42%	52%	10	501 LV	±4.5%
WXIA-TV Atlanta/SurveyUSA	October 18–20	40%	57%	17	609 LV	±4%
Rasmussen Reports/Pulse Opinion Research	October 14–20	38%	58%	20	Not reported	±5%
Atlanta Journal-Constitution/WSB-TV/Zogby International	October 13–15	41%	51%	10	503 LV	±4.5%
Atlanta Journal-Constitution/WSB-TV/Zogby International	October 6–8	39%	54%	15	501 LV	±4.5%
WXIA-TV Atlanta/SurveyUSA	October 5–7	39%	58%	19	594 LV	±4.1%
Rasmussen Reports/Pulse Opinion Research	September 24–30	39%	54%	15	Not reported	±5%
Rasmussen Reports/Pulse Opinion Research	September 9–22	42%	53%	11	400 LV	±5%
WXIA-TV Atlanta/SurveyUSA	September 13–15	38%	58%	20	658 LV	±3.9%
American Research Group	September 11–13	42%	53%	11	600 LV	±4%
Rasmussen Reports/Pulse Opinion Research	August 1–26	43%	54%	11	Not reported	±5%
Rasmussen Reports/Pulse Opinion Research	July 1–31	42%	53%	11	Not reported	±5%
Rasmussen Reports/Pulse Opinion Research	June 1–30	41%	52%	11	Not reported	±5%
Rasmussen Reports/Pulse Opinion Research	May 1–31	39%	51%	12	Not reported	±5%

Three-way race

Poll Source	Date administered (2004)	John Kerry	George W. Bush	Ralph Nader	Margin	Sample size	Margin of error
InsiderAdvantage	May 31–June 2	32%	49%	3%	17	Not reported	Not reported
Schapiro Research Group	February 5–9	44%	47%	1%	3	Not reported	Not reported

=== Hawaii ===
4 electoral votes
(Democrat in 1996)
(Democrat in 2000)

Poll Source	Date administered (2004)	John Kerry	George W. Bush	Margin	Sample size	Margin of error
Star-Bulletin/KITV-4 News/SMS Research	October 17–20	45%	46%	1	612 LV	±4%
Honolulu Star-Advertiser/Ward Research	October 13–18	42.6%	43.3%	0.7	600 LV	±4%

Three-way race

Poll Source	Date administered (2004)	John Kerry	George W. Bush	Ralph Nader	Margin	Sample size	Margin of error
American Research Group	September 7–11	51%	41%	4%	10	600 LV	±4%
Star-Bulletin/KITV-4 News/SMS Research	July 29–August 3	48%	41%	1%	7	681 RV	±3.7%

=== Idaho ===
4 electoral votes
(Republican in 1996)
(Republican in 2000)

Poll Source	Date administered (2004)	John Kerry	George W. Bush	Ralph Nader	Margin	Sample size	Margin of error
American Research Group	September 8–10	30%	59%	3%	29	600 LV	±4%
KTVB-TV/KIDO Radio/Greg Smith & Associates	June 8–10, 14	25%	55%	6%	30	400 LV	Not reported

=== Illinois ===
21 electoral votes
(Democrat in 1996)
(Democrat in 2000)

Poll Source	Date administered (2004)	John Kerry	George W. Bush	Margin	Sample size	Margin of error
McCulloch Research & Polling (R)	October 28–31	53%	43%	10	Not reported	Not reported
Rasmussen Reports/Pulse Opinion Research	October 24–30	51%	43%	8	Not reported	±4%
WBBM-TV Chicago/KSDK-TV St. Louis/SurveyUSA	October 27–29	54%	42%	12	665 LV	±3.9%
Chicago Tribune/WGN-TV/Market Shares Corp.	October 16–19	50%	42%	8	700 LV	±4%
WBBM-TV Chicago/KSDK-TV St. Louis/SurveyUSA	October 4–6	55%	39%	16	644 LV	±4%
Daily Southtown/Rasmussen Reports/Pulse Opinion Research	October 4	52%	41%	11	500 LV	±4.5%
Rasmussen Reports/Pulse Opinion Research	September 9–22	51%	42%	9	Not reported	±4%
Chicago Tribune/WGN-TV/Market Shares Corp.	September 17–20	49%	40%	9	700 LV	±4%
WBBM-TV Chicago/KSDK-TV St. Louis/SurveyUSA	September 12–14	49%	45%	4	618 LV	±4%
Chicago Tribune/WGN-TV/Market Shares Corp.	August 13–16	52%	38%	14	700 LV	±4%
Rasmussen Reports/Pulse Opinion Research	July 1–31	54%	39%	15	Not reported	±4%
Rasmussen Reports/Pulse Opinion Research	June 1–30	53%	37%	16	Not reported	±4%
WBBM-TV Chicago/KSDK-TV St. Louis/SurveyUSA	June 7–9	52%	39%	13	742 LV	±3.7%
Rasmussen Reports/Pulse Opinion Research	May 1–31	54%	38%	16	Not reported	±4%
Rasmussen Reports/Pulse Opinion Research	March 12	48%	43%	5	500 LV	±4.5%
Daily Southtown/Rasmussen Reports/Pulse Opinion Research	March 3	52%	39%	13	448 LV	±4.5%

Three-way race

Poll Source	Date administered (2004)	John Kerry	George W. Bush	Ralph Nader	Margin	Sample size	Margin of error
American Research Group	September 13–16	49%	43%	2%	6	600 LV	±4%
Chicago Tribune/WGN-TV/Market Shares Corp.	May 21–24	53%	37%	4%	16	600 LV	±4%
Rasmussen Reports/Pulse Opinion Research	March 12	46%	41%	8%	5	500 LV	±4.5%
Mason-Dixon Polling & Research	March 8–10	39%	47%	2%	8	625 RV	±4%

=== Indiana ===
11 electoral votes
(Republican in 1996)
(Republican in 2000)

Poll Source	Date administered (2004)	John Kerry	George W. Bush	Margin	Sample size	Margin of error
WXIN-TV Indianapolis/SurveyUSA	October 27–29	39%	58%	19	589 LV	±4.1%
WXIN-TV Indianapolis/SurveyUSA	October 17–19	37%	59%	22	602 LV	±4%
WXIN-TV Indianapolis/SurveyUSA	October 3–5	39%	58%	19	589 LV	±4.1%
Indianapolis Star/WTHR Channel 13/Selzer & Co.	September 29–October 3	33%	61%	28	Not reported	Not reported
American Research Group	September 16–20	39%	54%	15	600 LV	±4%
WXIN-TV Indianapolis/SurveyUSA	September 7–9	36%	60%	26	692 LV	±3.8%
Indiana Manufacturing Association/Bellwether Research & Consulting	August 15–18	40%	52%	12	601 LV	±4.0%
Market Research Informatics	July 8–12	27%	46%	19	852 RV	±3.5%
Indiana Manufacturing Association/Bellwether Research & Consulting	June 22–24	36%	52%	16	600 LV	±4.0%
Indiana Manufacturing Association/Bellwether Research & Consulting	March 22–24	37%	52%	15	600 LV	±4.0%
WXIN-TV Indianapolis/WHAS-TV Louisville/WBBM-TV Chicago/SurveyUSA	February 15–17	45%	51%	6	585 RV	±4.2%

Three-way race

Poll Source	Date administered (2004)	John Kerry	George W. Bush	Ralph Nader	Michael Badnarik	Margin	Sample size	Margin of error
Indianapolis Star/WTHR Channel 13/Selzer & Co.	October 27–29	37%	57%	N/A	1%	20	1,002 LV	±3.1%
Indianapolis Star/WTHR Channel 13/Selzer & Co.	May 13–19	33%	54%	6%	N/A	21	540 LV	Not reported

=== Iowa ===
7 electoral votes
(Democrat in 1996)
(Democrat in 2000)

Poll Source	Date administered (2004)	John Kerry	George W. Bush	Margin	Sample size	Margin of error
WHO-TV Des Moines/SurveyUSA	October 31–November 1	50%	47%	3	519 LV	±4.4%
Zogby Interactive (Daily Tracking)	October 29–November 1	50%	45%	5	602 LV	±4.1%
WHO-TV Des Moines/SurveyUSA	October 28–30	49%	49%	Tied	661 LV	±3.9%
Rasmussen Reports/Pulse Opinion Research	October 24–30	48%	48%	Tied	Not reported	±5%
MSNBC/Knight-Ridder/Mason-Dixon Polling & Research	October 27–29	44%	49%	5	625 LV	±4%
Zogby Interactive (Daily Tracking)	October 25–28	45%	44%	1	601 LV	±4.1%
American Research Group	October 25–27	47%	48%	1	600 LV	±4%
Zogby Interactive (Daily Tracking)	October 21–24	45%	47%	2	603 LV	±4.1%
Rasmussen Reports/Pulse Opinion Research	October 9–22	46%	48%	2	400 LV	±5%
WHO-TV Des Moines/SurveyUSA	October 18–20	45%	51%	6	690 LV	±3.8%
American Research Group	October 10–12	47%	47%	Tied	600 LV	±4%
Rasmussen Reports/Pulse Opinion Research	September 27–October 10	50%	46%	4	400 LV	±5%
WHO-TV Des Moines/SurveyUSA	October 4–6	48%	47%	1	669 LV	±3.9%
Humphrey Institute/University of Connecticut	September 27–October 3	48%	47%	1	599 LV	±4%
Rasmussen Reports/Pulse Opinion Research	September 24–30	45%	48%	3	Not reported	±5%
Rasmussen Reports/Pulse Opinion Research	September 10–23	45%	48%	3	400 LV	±5%
WHO-TV Des Moines/SurveyUSA	September 20–22	46%	50%	4	784 LV	±3.6%
CNN/USA Today/Gallup	August 23–26	51%	46%	5	606 LV	±5%
Rasmussen Reports/Pulse Opinion Research	August 1–26	48%	46%	2	Not reported	±5%
Rasmussen Reports/Pulse Opinion Research	July 1–31	48%	45%	3	Not reported	±5%
American Research Group	July 26–28	47%	47%	Tied	600 LV	±4%
Humphrey Institute/University of Connecticut	June 21–July 12	50.4%	45.7%	4.7	614 RV	±4%
Rasmussen Reports/Pulse Opinion Research	June 1–30	48%	44%	4	Not reported	±5%
Republican National Committee/Public Opinion Strategies (R)	June 1–6	48.8%	41.9%	6.9	800 LV	±3.46%
Rasmussen Reports/Pulse Opinion Research	May 1–31	49%	41%	8	Not reported	±5%
WHO-TV Des Moines/SurveyUSA	May 24–26	48%	45%	3	794 LV	±3.6%
American Research Group	April 18–21	48%	47%	1	600 LV	±4%
Rasmussen Reports/Pulse Opinion Research	March 23	51%	41%	10	500 LV	±4.5%
Des Moines Register/Selzer & Co.	February 7–11	49%	42%	7	800 LV	±3.5%

Three-way race

Poll Source	Date administered (2004)	John Kerry	George W. Bush	Ralph Nader	Margin	Sample size	Margin of error
Fox News/Opinion Dynamics Corporation	October 30–31	44%	48%	1%	4	700 LV	±3.7%
CNN/USA Today/Gallup	October 27–30	46%	48%	2%	2	1,119 LV	±3%
Des Moines Register/Selzer & Co.	October 25–29	48%	45%	1%	3	806 LV	±3.5%
American Research Group	October 25–27	47%	48%	1%	1	600 LV	±4%
CNN/USA Today/Gallup	October 22–25	46%	50%	1%	4	649 LV	±4%
Capital Surveys Inc.	October 14–19	46%	45%	1%	1	502 LV	±4%
MSNBC/Knight-Ridder/Mason-Dixon Polling & Research	October 15–18	43%	49%	1%	6	625 LV	±4%
Wall Street Journal/Zogby Interactive	October 13–18	51.1%	47.9%	0.4%	3.2	571 LV	±4.1%
American Research Group	October 10–12	47%	47%	1%	Tied	600 LV	±4%
Chicago Tribune/Market Shares Corp.	October 8–11	45%	47%	1%	2	500 LV	±4.4%
Wall Street Journal/Zogby Interactive	September 30–October 5	51.1%	44.5%	0.2%	6.6	586 LV	±4.1%
America Coming Together/Harstad Strategic Research (D)	October 3–4	43%	46%	3%	3	717 RV	±3.7%
Humphrey Institute/University of Connecticut	September 27–October 3	47%	46%	4%	1	599 LV	±4%
Fox News/Opinion Dynamics Corporation	September 21–22	45%	48%	1%	3	800 LV	±3.5%
CNN/USA Today/Gallup	September 16–19	44%	50%	2%	6	631 LV	±5%
Wall Street Journal/Zogby Interactive	September 13–17	50.3%	47.3%	0.7%	3	566 LV	±4.1%
MSNBC/Knight-Ridder/Mason-Dixon Polling & Research	September 14–16	42%	48%	2%	6	626 LV	±4%
American Research Group	September 12–14	46%	48%	1%	2	600 LV	±4%
Wall Street Journal/Zogby Interactive	August 30–September 3	50.6%	46.9%	0.8%	3.7	565 LV	±4.1%
CNN/USA Today/Gallup	August 23–26	51%	45%	2%	6	606 LV	±5%
Wall Street Journal/Zogby Interactive	August 16–21	52.2%	45.2%	0.6%	7	508 LV	±4.4%
Wall Street Journal/Zogby Interactive	July 26–30	50%	46.1%	0.6%	3.9	497 LV	±4.4%
American Research Group	July 26–28	46%	46%	2%	Tied	600 LV	±4%
Wall Street Journal/Zogby Interactive	July 19–23	49.3%	47.5%	0.6%	1.8	490 LV	±4.4%
Des Moines Register/Selzer & Co.	July 17–21	45%	46%	2%	1	641 LV	±3.9%
Wall Street Journal/Zogby Interactive	July 6–10	48.2%	46.7%	1.9%	1.5	479 LV	±4.0%
Wall Street Journal/Zogby Interactive	June 15–20	48.9%	46.8%	1.9%	2.1	485 LV	±4.5%
Wall Street Journal/Zogby Interactive	June 1–6	48.9%	47.6%	1.2%	1.3	702 LV	±3.7%
Wall Street Journal/Zogby Interactive	May 18–23	44.9%	50.1%	0.8%	5.2	588 LV	±4.0%
American Research Group	April 18–21	47%	46%	3%	1	600 LV	±4%

Four-way race

Poll Source	Date administered (2004)	John Kerry	George W. Bush	Ralph Nader	Michael Badnarik	Margin	Sample size	Margin of error
Humphrey Institute/University of Connecticut	June 21–July 12	47.7%	44.4%	2.7%	1.1%	3.3	614 RV	±4%

=== Kansas ===
6 electoral votes
(Republican in 1996)
(Republican in 2000)

Poll Source	Date administered (2004)	John Kerry	George W. Bush	Margin	Sample size	Margin of error
KWCH-TV Wichita/SurveyUSA	October 25–27	37%	60%	23	651 LV	±3.8%
KWCH-TV Wichita/SurveyUSA	October 9–11	38%	57%	19	595 LV	±4.1%
KWCH-TV Wichita/SurveyUSA	September 7–9	35%	60%	25	604 LV	±4%
KWCH-TV Wichita/SurveyUSA	June 28–30	36%	56%	20	598 LV	±4.1%
KWCH-TV Wichita/SurveyUSA	March 3–4	39%	57%	18	501 RV	±4.5%
KWCH-TV Wichita/SurveyUSA	February 9–10	44%	52%	8	549 RV	±4.3%

Three-way race

Poll Source	Date administered (2004)	John Kerry	George W. Bush	Ralph Nader	Margin	Sample size	Margin of error
Kansas City Star/Midwest Survey Research	October 22–26	30%	59%	1%	29	573 LV	±4.1%
American Research Group	September 15–18	35%	57%	2%	22	600 LV	±4%

=== Kentucky ===
8 electoral votes
(Democrat in 1996)
(Republican in 2000)

Poll Source	Date administered (2004)	John Kerry	George W. Bush	Margin	Sample size	Margin of error
WHAS-TV Louisville/WLEX-TV Lexington/SurveyUSA	October 28–30	38%	59%	21	636 LV	±4%
WHAS-TV Louisville/WLEX-TV Lexington/SurveyUSA	October 17–19	37%	59%	22	629 LV	±4%
WHAS-TV Louisville/WLEX-TV Lexington/SurveyUSA	October 4–6	38%	57%	19	622 LV	±4%
WHAS-TV Louisville/WLEX-TV Lexington/SurveyUSA	September 7–9	39%	56%	17	665 LV	±3.9%
WHAS-TV Louisville/WLEX-TV Lexington/SurveyUSA	August 13–15	39%	56%	17	697 LV	±3.8%
WHAS-TV Louisville/WLEX-TV Lexington/SurveyUSA	July 24–26	42%	52%	10	690 LV	±3.8%
WHAS-TV Louisville/WLEX-TV Lexington/SurveyUSA	June 7–8	39%	52%	13	669 LV	±3.9%
Louisville Courier-Journal (Bluegrass Poll)	May 5–11	40%	52%	12	665 LV	±3.8%
WHAS-TV Louisville/WLEX-TV Lexington/SurveyUSA	February 14–16	41%	57%	16	681 RV	±3.8%
Louisville Courier-Journal (Bluegrass Poll)	January 30–February 4	38%	55%	17	600 LV	±4%

Three-way race

Poll Source	Date administered (2004)	John Kerry	George W. Bush	Ralph Nader	Margin	Sample size	Margin of error
Louisville Courier-Journal (Bluegrass Poll)	October 18–20	39%	56%	1%	16	690 LV	±3.1%
Louisville Courier-Journal (Bluegrass Poll)	September 10–15	38%	53%	3%	15	657 LV	±3.8%
American Research Group	September 8–12	39%	57%	1%	18	600 LV	±4%

=== Louisiana ===
9 electoral votes
(Democrat in 1996)
(Republican in 2000)

Poll Source	Date administered (2004)	John Kerry	George W. Bush	Margin	Sample size	Margin of error
University of New Orleans	October 13–21	38%	50%	12	Not reported	Not reported
KALB-TV Alexandria/WAFB-TV Baton Rouge/KPLC-TV Lake Charles/KNOE-TV Monroe/WDSU-TV New Orleans/KSLA-TV Shreveport/Southern Media & Opinion Research	October 12–13	31%	50%	19	600 LV	±4%
Marketing Research Institute	October 4–7	36%	51%	15	600 RV	±4.1%
Marketing Research Institute	August 31–September 2	36%	53%	17	600 RV	±4.1%
Marketing Research Institute	July 14–20	38%	54%	16	600 RV	±4%
Marketing Research Institute	May 19–27	42%	48%	6	600 RV	±4%
Multi-Quest International	May 21–25	29%	48%	19	400 RV	Not reported

Three-way race

Poll Source	Date administered (2004)	John Kerry	George W. Bush	Ralph Nader	Margin	Sample size	Margin of error
Southeastern Louisiana University	October 17–22	32%	58%	1%	26	Not reported	Not reported
Marketing Research Institute	October 17–19	37%	52%	1%	15	Not reported	Not reported
TV8 News/Ed Renwick/Loyola University New Orleans	October 12–15	39%	47%	2%	8	600 RV	±4.1%
American Research Group	September 17–21	42%	50%	1%	8	600 LV	±4%
Harris, DeVille & Associates/Southern Media & Opinion Research	March 17–29	37.6%	51.7%	1.7%	14.1	700 RV	±3.8%

Six-way race

Poll Source	Date administered (2004)	John Kerry	George W. Bush	Ralph Nader	Michael Badnarik	David Cobb	Michael Peroutka	Margin	Sample size	Margin of error
Rasmussen Reports/Pulse Opinion Research	October 6	44%	52%	1%	0%	1%	0%	8	500 LV	±4.5%

=== Maine ===
4 electoral votes
(Democrat in 1996)
(Democrat in 2000)

Poll Source	Date administered (2004)	John Kerry	George W. Bush	Margin	Sample size	Margin of error
WCSH-TV Portland/WLBZ-TV Bangor/SurveyUSA	October 28–30	52%	44%	8	1,008 LV	±3.2%
WCSH-TV Portland/WLBZ-TV Bangor/SurveyUSA	October 17–19	51%	45%	6	660 LV	±3.9%
WCSH-TV Portland/WLBZ-TV Bangor/SurveyUSA	October 3–5	49%	47%	2	653 LV	±3.9%
WCSH-TV Portland/WLBZ-TV Bangor/SurveyUSA	September 20–22	46%	47%	1	636 LV	±4%
Rasmussen Reports/Pulse Opinion Research	August 1–26	49%	44%	5	Not reported	±5%
WCSH-TV Portland/WLBZ-TV Bangor/SurveyUSA	August 22–24	49%	44%	5	632 LV	±4%
Rasmussen Reports/Pulse Opinion Research	July 1–31	48%	44%	4	Not reported	±5%
Rasmussen Reports/Pulse Opinion Research	June 1–30	46%	45%	1	Not reported	±5%
Rasmussen Reports/Pulse Opinion Research	May 1–31	54%	35%	19	Not reported	±5%
Critical Insights	May 7–20	49%	39%	10	Not reported	Not reported

Three-way race

Poll Source	Date administered (2004)	John Kerry	George W. Bush	Ralph Nader	Margin	Sample size	Margin of error
Maine Sunday Telegram/Zogby International	October 20–21	50%	39%	1%	11	402 LV	±5%
Strategic Marketing Services	September 23–27	42%	39%	4%	3	400 LV	±5%
Critical Insights	September 10–23	45%	42%	3%	3	600 LV	±4%
American Research Group	September 8–10	48%	44%	4%	4	600 LV	±4%
Portland Press Herald/Maine Sunday Telegram/Zogby International	September 9	43%	43%	3%	Tied	400 LV	±5.0%
Strategic Marketing Services	June 5–12	43.5%	41%	4.5%	2.5	400 RV	±4.9%
Strategic Marketing Services	February 28–March 3	51%	38%	4%	13	400 RV	±4.9%

1st congressional district

Poll Source	Date administered (2004)	John Kerry	George W. Bush	Margin	Sample size	Margin of error
WCSH-TV Portland/WLBZ-TV Bangor/SurveyUSA	October 28–30	53%	44%	9	527 LV	Not reported
WCSH-TV Portland/WLBZ-TV Bangor/SurveyUSA	October 17–19	49%	46%	3	350 LV	Not reported
WCSH-TV Portland/WLBZ-TV Bangor/SurveyUSA	October 3–5	53%	43%	10	343 LV	Not reported
WCSH-TV Portland/WLBZ-TV Bangor/SurveyUSA	September 20–22	49%	45%	4	343 LV	Not reported
WCSH-TV Portland/WLBZ-TV Bangor/SurveyUSA	August 22–24	52%	43%	9	332 LV	Not reported

2nd congressional district

Poll Source	Date administered (2004)	John Kerry	George W. Bush	Margin	Sample size	Margin of error
WCSH-TV Portland/WLBZ-TV Bangor/SurveyUSA	October 28–30	52%	45%	7	480 LV	Not reported
WCSH-TV Portland/WLBZ-TV Bangor/SurveyUSA	October 17–19	53%	44%	9	311 LV	Not reported
WCSH-TV Portland/WLBZ-TV Bangor/SurveyUSA	October 3–5	44%	53%	9	310 LV	Not reported
WCSH-TV Portland/WLBZ-TV Bangor/SurveyUSA	September 20–22	44%	49%	5	293 LV	Not reported
WCSH-TV Portland/WLBZ-TV Bangor/SurveyUSA	August 22–24	45%	45%	Tied	299 LV	Not reported

=== Maryland ===
10 electoral votes
(Democrat in 1996)
(Democrat in 2000)

Poll Source	Date administered (2004)	John Kerry	George W. Bush	Margin	Sample size	Margin of error
WMAR-TV Baltimore/SurveyUSA	October 27–29	54%	43%	11	607 LV	±4.1%
Baltimore Sun/Ipsos	October 25–26	56%	39%	17	602 RV	±4%
NBC4 News/Mason-Dixon Polling & Research	October 24–26	52%	41%	11	625 LV	±4%
Rasmussen Reports/Pulse Opinion Research	October 9–22	53%	43%	10	Not reported	±5%
Rasmussen Reports/Pulse Opinion Research	September 26–October 8	52%	41%	9	400 LV	±5%
WMAR-TV Baltimore/SurveyUSA	October 5–7	56%	41%	15	583 LV	±4.1%
Rasmussen Reports/Pulse Opinion Research	September 14–27	48%	45%	3	400 LV	±5%
WMAR-TV Baltimore/SurveyUSA	September 17–19	48%	48%	Tied	598 LV	±4.1%
Rasmussen Reports/Pulse Opinion Research	August 1–26	54%	41%	13	Not reported	±5%
WMAR-TV Baltimore/SurveyUSA	August 23–25	53%	42%	11	594 LV	±4.1%
Gonzales Research & Marketing Strategies Inc.	August 10–15	53%	40%	13	847 RV	±3.5%
Rasmussen Reports/Pulse Opinion Research	June 1–30	53%	39%	14	Not reported	±5%
Gonzales Research & Marketing Strategies Inc.	February 3–8	51%	40%	11	Not reported	Not reported

Three-way race

Poll Source	Date administered (2004)	John Kerry	George W. Bush	Ralph Nader	Margin	Sample size	Margin of error
Gonzales Research & Marketing Strategies Inc.	October 1–5	52%	42%	1%	10	801 RV	±3.5%
American Research Group	September 7–9	52%	43%	2%	9	600 LV	±4%
Gonzales Research & Marketing Strategies Inc.	June 4–9	52%	38%	2%	14	836 RV	±3.5%
Gonzales Research & Marketing Strategies Inc.	March 19–24	48%	43%	0%	5	825 RV	±3.5%
NBC4 News/Mason-Dixon Polling & Research	February 23–25	47%	38%	3%	9	625 RV	±4%

=== Massachusetts ===
12 electoral votes
(Democrat in 1996)
(Democrat in 2000)

Poll Source	Date administered (2004)	John Kerry	George W. Bush	Margin	Sample size	Margin of error
Rasmussen Reports/Pulse Opinion Research	June 1–30	60%	31%	29	Not reported	±4%
Rasmussen Reports/Pulse Opinion Research	May 1–31	58%	33%	25	Not reported	±4%
7NEWS/Suffolk University	February 20–22	57%	34%	23	400 LV	±4.9%
WBZ-TV/Boston Globe/KRC Communications Research	November 19–22, 2003	56%	38%	18	400 RV	±5%

Three-way race

Poll Source	Date administered (2004)	John Kerry	George W. Bush	Ralph Nader	Margin	Sample size	Margin of error
Merrimack College	September 25–October 5	50%	36%	2%	14	805 A	±3.5%
American Research Group	September 10–13	64%	27%	4%	37	600 LV	±4%
Merrimack College	July 18–28	56%	30%	3%	26	601 A	±4.1%
7NEWS/Suffolk University	July 18	59%	30%	2%	29	400 LV	±4.9%
University of Massachusetts	May 2–6	54%	30%	5%	24	400 LV	±5%
University of Massachusetts	March 29–April 5	54.2%	31.5%	2.2%	22.7	400 LV	±5%

=== Michigan ===
17 electoral votes
(Democrat in 1996)
(Democrat in 2000)

Poll Source	Date administered (2004)	John Kerry	George W. Bush	Margin	Sample size	Margin of error
Zogby International (Daily Tracking)	October 29–November 1	52%	46%	6	601 LV	±4.1%
WZZM-TV Grand Rapids/WDIV-TV Detroit/SurveyUSA	October 28–30	50%	47%	3	671 LV	±3.9%
MSNBC/Knight-Ridder/Mason-Dixon Polling & Research	October 27–29	47%	45%	2	625 LV	±4%
Zogby International (Daily Tracking)	October 25–28	45%	47%	2	601 LV	±4.1%
Rasmussen Reports/Pulse Opinion Research (Daily Tracking)	October 20–26	51%	46%	5	561 LV	Not reported
Zogby International (Daily Tracking)	October 21–24	52%	42%	10	602 LV	±4.1%
WZZM-TV Grand Rapids/WDIV-TV Detroit/SurveyUSA	October 18–20	51%	44%	7	668 LV	±3.9%
Rasmussen Reports/Pulse Opinion Research (Daily Tracking)	October 13–19	49%	46%	3	400 LV	±5%
MSNBC/Knight-Ridder/Mason-Dixon Polling & Research	October 15–18	47%	46%	1	625 LV	±4%
Rasmussen Reports/Pulse Opinion Research (Daily Tracking)	October 6–12	49%	46%	3	400 LV	±5%
WZZM-TV Grand Rapids/WDIV-TV Detroit/SurveyUSA	October 4–6	52%	42%	10	659 LV	±3.9%
Rasmussen Reports/Pulse Opinion Research (Daily Tracking)	September 30–October 5	49%	46%	3	400 LV	±5%
Rasmussen Reports/Pulse Opinion Research (Daily Tracking)	September 23–29	46%	46%	Tied	400 LV	±5%
Detroit Free Press/Consumer Contact	September 22–28	48%	50%	2	830 RV	±3.5%
Rasmussen Reports/Pulse Opinion Research (Daily Tracking)	September 17–23	49%	44%	5	400 LV	±5%
Rasmussen Reports/Pulse Opinion Research	September 5–11	50%	45%	5	Not reported	±4%
Rasmussen Reports/Pulse Opinion Research	August 27–September 3	48%	44%	4	400 LV	±5%
Rasmussen Reports/Pulse Opinion Research	August 1–26	50%	45%	5	Not reported	±4%
WZZM-TV Grand Rapids/WDIV-TV Detroit/SurveyUSA	August 22–24	48%	45%	3	548 LV	±4.3%
American Research Group	August 17–19	49%	46%	3	600 LV	±4%
WZZM-TV Grand Rapids/WDIV-TV Detroit/SurveyUSA	August 2–4	52%	41%	11	608 LV	±4%
Rasmussen Reports/Pulse Opinion Research	July 1–31	50%	44%	6	Not reported	±4%
American Research Group	July 6–8	51%	43%	8	600 LV	±4%
Rasmussen Reports/Pulse Opinion Research	June 1–30	46%	44%	2	Not reported	±4%
WZZM-TV Grand Rapids/WDIV-TV Detroit/SurveyUSA	June 28–30	51%	41%	10	594 LV	±4.1%
Fox News/Opinion Dynamics Corporation	June 22–23	44%	43%	1	750 RV	±4%
Detroit Free Press/EPIC-MRA	June 2–6	47%	45%	2	600 LV	±4%
Republican National Committee/Public Opinion Strategies (R)	June 1–6	46.5%	43.3%	3.2	800 LV	±3.46%
WZZM-TV Grand Rapids/WDIV-TV Detroit/SurveyUSA	May 31–June 2	47%	43%	4	567 LV	±4.3%
Rasmussen Reports/Pulse Opinion Research	May 1–31	47%	41%	6	Not reported	±4%
WZZM-TV Grand Rapids/WDIV-TV Detroit/SurveyUSA	April 30–May 2	47%	43%	4	536 LV	±4.3%
WZZM-TV Grand Rapids/WDIV-TV Detroit/SurveyUSA	April 2–4	51%	41%	10	536 LV	±4.3%
EPIC-MRA	March 28–April 1	47%	45%	2	600 LV	±4%
Rasmussen Reports/Pulse Opinion Research	March 14–16	48%	44%	4	500 LV	±4.5%
Inside Michigan Politics/Marketing Resource Group	March 8–14	45%	47%	2	600 RV	±4.1%
EPIC-MRA	February 22–25	49%	44%	5	600 LV	±4%
SurveyUSA	January 31–February 2	51%	46%	5	724 RV	±3.7%
EPIC-MRA	December 17–23, 2003	41%	51%	10	600 RV	±4%

Three-way race

Poll Source	Date administered (2004)	John Kerry	George W. Bush	Ralph Nader	Margin	Sample size	Margin of error
Detroit News/Mitchell Research & Communications (Daily Tracking)	October 26–28	43%	41%	2%	2	600 LV	±4%
Detroit News/Mitchell Research & Communications (Daily Tracking)	October 23–25	45%	44%	1%	1	600 LV	Not reported
EPIC-MRA	October 18–21	49%	43%	1%	6	610 LV	±4%
Detroit News/Mitchell Research & Communications (Daily Tracking)	October 17–19	43%	47%	1%	4	600 LV	Not reported
Wall Street Journal/Zogby Interactive	October 13–18	52.6%	45.9%	0.4%	6.7	1,228 LV	±2.8%
Wall Street Journal/Zogby Interactive	September 20–October 5	54.1%	44.4%	0.3%	9.7	1,207 LV	±2.8%
Inside Michigan Politics/Marketing Resource Group	September 20–24	45%	43%	1%	2	600 RV	±4.1%
Fox News/Opinion Dynamics Corporation	September 21–22	46%	44%	1%	2	800 LV	±3.5%
American Research Group	September 17–21	48%	40%	1%	8	600 LV	±4%
EPIC-MRA	September 15–19	48%	44%	2%	4	600 LV	±4%
Wall Street Journal/Zogby Interactive	September 13–17	51.9%	45.9%	0.8%	6	1,139 LV	±2.9%
MSNBC/Knight-Ridder/Mason-Dixon Polling & Research	September 14–16	47%	41%	2%	6	629 LV	±4%
CNN/USA Today/Gallup	September 10–13	50%	44%	1%	6	673 LV	±5%
Wall Street Journal/Zogby Interactive	August 30–September 3	52%	45.4%	0.7%	6.6	1,098 LV	±3.0%
Wall Street Journal/Zogby Interactive	August 16–21	50.5%	45.3%	0.7%	5.2	966 LV	±3.2%
American Research Group	August 17–19	48%	45%	1%	3	600 LV	±4%
Detroit Free Press/EPIC-MRA	August 4–10	49%	42%	3%	7	600 LV	±4%
Wall Street Journal/Zogby Interactive	July 26–30	52.1%	44.6%	1.2%	7.5	1,022 LV	±3.1%
Wall Street Journal/Zogby Interactive	July 19–23	52.6%	43.9%	1.3%	8.7	985 LV	±3.1%
Wall Street Journal/Zogby Interactive	July 6–10	50%	44.1%	1.9%	5.9	863 LV	±3.3%
EPIC-MRA	July 6–8	47%	44%	3%	4	600 LV	±4%
American Research Group	July 6–8	50%	43%	2%	7	600 LV	±4%
Detroit News/Mitchell Research & Communications	June 24–30	43%	44%	4%	1	400 LV	±5%
Fox News/Opinion Research Corporation	June 22–23	40%	42%	5%	2	750 RV	±4%
Wall Street Journal/Zogby Interactive	June 15–20	46.1%	46.8%	2.3%	0.7	916 LV	±3.2%
Los Angeles Times	June 5–8	42%	44%	4%	2	Not reported	Not reported
Detroit Free Press/EPIC-MRA	June 2–6	45%	43%	3%	2	600 LV	±4%
Wall Street Journal/Zogby Interactive	June 1–6	49.1%	45.1%	1.1%	4	1,400 LV	±2.6%
Wall Street Journal/Zogby Interactive	May 18–23	49.5%	41.2%	2.4%	7.3	612 LV	±4.0%
Detroit News/Mitchell Research & Communications	May 11–12	40%	44%	2%	4	413 LV	±5%
EPIC-MRA	March 28–April 1	45%	43%	3%	2	600 LV	±4%
Mitchell Research & Communications	February 26–March 1	46%	40%	4%	6	600 LV	±4%

=== Minnesota ===
10 electoral votes
(Democrat in 1996)
(Democrat in 2000)

Poll Source	Date administered (2004)	John Kerry	George W. Bush	Margin	Sample size	Margin of error
Reuters/Zogby International (Daily Tracking)	October 29–November 1	51%	45%	6	601 LV	±4.1%
Rasmussen Reports/Pulse Opinion Research (Daily Tracking)	October 25–31	48%	47%	1	Not reported	±5%
St. Paul Pioneer Press/Minnesota Public Radio/Mason-Dixon Polling & Research	October 27–29	47%	48%	1	625 LV	±4%
Reuters/Zogby International (Daily Tracking)	October 25–28	45%	46%	1	603 LV	±4.1%
Humphrey Institute/University of Connecticut	October 21–26	47%	48%	1	690 LV	±4%
St. Cloud State University	October 19–26	49%	42%	7	Not reported	Not reported
Reuters/Zogby International (Daily Tracking)	October 21–24	46%	45%	1	603 LV	±4.1%
Rasmussen Reports/Pulse Opinion Research (Daily Tracking)	October 18–24	46%	48%	2	Not reported	±5%
Rasmussen Reports/Pulse Opinion Research (Daily Tracking)	October 11–17	48%	49%	1	772 LV	±4%
Rasmussen Reports/Pulse Opinion Research (Daily Tracking)	October 4–10	48%	45%	3	500 LV	±4.5%
Rasmussen Reports/Pulse Opinion Research (Daily Tracking)	September 27–October 3	48%	43%	3	500 LV	±4.5%
Rasmussen Reports/Pulse Opinion Research (Daily Tracking)	September 18–24	48%	50%	2	500 LV	±4.5%
St. Paul Pioneer Press/Minnesota Public Radio/Mason-Dixon Polling & Research	September 14–16	45%	46%	1	625 LV	±4%
CNN/USA Today/Gallup	September 11–14	46%	48%	2	675 LV	±4%
Rasmussen Reports/Pulse Opinion Research	August 27–September 3	46%	46%	Tied	400 LV	±5%
Rasmussen Reports/Pulse Opinion Research	August 1–26	48%	44%	4	Not reported	±5%
Rasmussen Reports/Pulse Opinion Research	July 1–31	49%	42%	7	Not reported	±5%
St. Paul Pioneer Press/Minnesota Public Radio/Mason-Dixon Polling & Research	July 12–14	48%	45%	3	625 RV	±4%
Humphrey Institute/University of Connecticut	June 21–July 12	49%	45.8%	3.2	589 RV	±4%
Rasmussen Reports/Pulse Opinion Research	June 1–30	50%	41%	9	Not reported	±5%
Republican National Committee/Public Opinion Strategies (R)	June 1–June 6	46.5%	42.2%	4.3	800 LV	±3.46%
Rasmussen Reports/Pulse Opinion Research	May 1–31	48%	43%	5	Not reported	±5%
St. Paul Pioneer Press/Minnesota Public Radio/Mason-Dixon Polling & Research	May 24–26	45%	41%	4	625 RV	±4%
Rasmussen Reports/Pulse Opinion Research	March 23	47%	44%	3	500 LV	±4.5%
St. Paul Pioneer Press/Minnesota Public Radio/Mason Dixon Polling & Research	January 26–28	43%	41%	2	625 RV	±4%

Three-way race

Poll Source	Date administered (2004)	John Kerry	George W. Bush	Ralph Nader	Margin	Sample size	Margin of error
CNN/USA Today/Gallup	October 28–30	52%	44%	1%	8	1,078 LV	±4%
Minnesota Star Tribune	October 26–29	49%	41%	1%	8	996 LV	±3.5%
St. Paul Pioneer Press/Mason-Dixon Polling & Research	October 15–18	45%	47%	2%	2	625 LV	±4%
Wall Street Journal/Zogby Interactive	October 13–18	54.2%	43.1%	1.1%	11.1	792 LV	±3.5%
Star Tribune/Market Solutions Group	October 9–11	48%	43%	2%	5	809 LV	±3.4%
Chicago Tribune/Market Shares Corporation	October 8–11	45%	43%	2%	2	500 LV	±4.4%
Wall Street Journal/Zogby Interactive	September 30−October 5	52.4%	44.1%	1.7%	8.3	814 LV	±3.4%
America Coming Together/Hart Research Associates (D)	October 2–4	50%	43%	1%	7	801 RV	±3%
Wall Street Journal/Zogby Interactive	September 13–17	51.7%	42%	3.9%	9.7	730 LV	±3.6%
Minnesota Public Radio/Mason-Dixon Polling & Research	September 11–14	44%	46%	1%	2	625 LV	±4%
CNN/USA Today/Gallup	September 11–14	45%	45%	5%	Tied	675 LV	±4%
American Research Group	September 10–12	47%	45%	2%	2	600 LV	±4%
Wall Street Journal/Zogby Interactive	August 30–September 3	50.3%	43.5%	2.8%	6.8	725 LV	±3.6%
Wall Street Journal/Zogby Interactive	August 16–21	50.3%	44.6%	1%	5.7	673 LV	±3.8%
Wall Street Journal/Zogby Interactive	July 26–30	51.8%	43.7%	1.2%	8.1	652 LV	±3.8%
Wall Street Journal/Zogby Interactive	July 19–23	50.6%	44.2%	1.7%	6.4	632 LV	±3.9%
St. Paul Pioneer Press/Minnesota Public Radio/Mason-Dixon Polling & Research	July 12–14	45%	44%	1%	1	625 RV	±4%
Wall Street Journal/Zogby Interactive	July 6–10	49.3%	44.1%	2%	5.2	573 LV	±4.1%
Wall Street Journal/Zogby Interactive	June 15–20	49.8%	45.2%	2.5%	4.6	649 LV	±3.9%
Wall Street Journal/Zogby Interactive	June 1–6	50.7%	43.6%	2.3%	7.1	672 LV	±3.8%
St. Paul Pioneer Press/Minnesota Public Radio/Mason-Dixon Polling & Research	May 24–26	44%	41%	2%	3	625 RV	±4%
Wall Street Journal/Zogby Interactive	May 18–23	51.3%	42%	3.4%	9.3	928 LV	±3.2%
Star Tribune	March 28–31	50%	38%	2%	12	562 LV	±4.1%

Four-way race

Poll Source	Date administered (2004)	John Kerry	George W. Bush	Ralph Nader	Michael Badnarik	Margin	Sample size	Margin of error
Humphrey Institute/University of Connecticut	October 21–26	44%	47%	5%	1%	3	690 LV	±4%
Humphrey Institute/University of Connecticut	June 21–July 12	46.5%	44.2%	4.6%	1%	2.3	589 RV	±4%

Eight-way race

Poll Source	Date administered (2004)	John Kerry	George W. Bush	Ralph Nader	Michael Badnarik	David Cobb	Roger Calero	Thomas Harens	Michael Peroutka	Margin	Sample size	Margin of error
Star Tribune/Market Solutions Group	September 7–13	50%	41%	0%	0%	0%	0%	0%	0%	9	1,035 LV	±3%

=== Mississippi ===
6 electoral votes
(Republican in 1996)
(Republican in 2000)

Poll Source	Date administered (2004)	John Kerry	George W. Bush	Margin	Sample size	Margin of error
Mississippi State University	April 5–21	30%	61.2%	31.2	300 LV	±5.8%

Three-way race

Poll Source	Date administered (2004)	John Kerry	George W. Bush	Ralph Nader	Margin	Sample size	Margin of error
American Research Group	September 14–17	42%	51%	1%	9	600 LV	±4%

=== Missouri ===
11 electoral votes
(Democrat in 1996)
(Republican in 2000)

Poll Source	Date administered (2004)	John Kerry	George W. Bush	Margin	Sample size	Margin of error
KSDK-TV St. Louis/KOMU-TV Columbia/SurveyUSA	October 29–31	47%	52%	5	694 LV	±3.8%
MSNBC/Knight-Ridder/Mason-Dixon Polling & Research	October 27–29	44%	49%	5	625 LV	±4%
Kansas City Star/KMBC-TV/Market Research Institute	October 22–26	45%	49%	4	553 LV	±4.1%
KSDK-TV St. Louis/KOMU-TV Columbia/SurveyUSA	October 23–25	45%	52%	7	680 LV	±3.8%
Rasmussen Reports/Pulse Opinion Research	October 7–20	45%	50%	5	400 LV	±5%
KSDK-TV St. Louis/KOMU-TV Columbia/SurveyUSA	October 16–18	45%	51%	6	670 LV	±3.9%
Rasmussen Reports/Pulse Opinion Research	September 22–October 5	45%	51%	6	400 LV	±5%
KSDK-TV St. Louis/KOMU-TV Columbia/SurveyUSA	October 2–4	47%	49%	2	683 LV	±3.8%
American Research Group	September 16–19	44%	50%	6	600 LV	±4%
KSDK-TV St. Louis/KOMU-TV Columbia/SurveyUSA	September 7–9	46%	48%	2	660 LV	±3.9%
CNN/USA Today/Gallup	September 3–7	41%	55%	14	686 LV	±4%
Rasmussen Reports/Pulse Opinion Research	August 20–September 3	42%	48%	6	400 LV	±5%
Los Angeles Times	August 21–24	44%	48%	4	580 RV	±4%
KSDK-TV St. Louis/KOMU-TV Columbia/SurveyUSA	August 15–17	47%	48%	1	643 LV	±4%
Rasmussen Reports/Pulse Opinion Research	July 1–31	46%	50%	4	Not reported	±5%
CNN/USA Today/Gallup	July 19–22	48%	48%	Tied	636 LV	±5%
KSDK-TV St. Louis/KOMU-TV Columbia/SurveyUSA	July 6–8	46%	48%	2	755 LV	±3.6%
Los Angeles Times	June 5–8	42%	48%	6	566 RV	±4%
Rasmussen Reports/Pulse Opinion Research	June 1–30	44%	48%	4	Not reported	±5%
Republican National Committee/Public Opinion Strategies (R)	June 1–6	44%	48.9%	4.9	800 LV	±3.46%
Rasmussen Reports/Pulse Opinion Research	May 1–31	43%	44%	1	Not reported	±5%
Rasmussen Reports/Pulse Opinion Research	March 23	42%	49%	7	500 LV	±4.5%

Three-way race

Poll Source	Date administered (2004)	John Kerry	George W. Bush	Ralph Nader	Margin	Sample size	Margin of error
Wall Street Journal/Zogby Interactive	October 25–30	47.2%	51.4%	0.7%	4.2	1,343 LV	±2.7%
MSNBC/Knight-Ridder/Mason-Dixon Polling & Research	October 15–18	44%	49%	0%	5	625 LV	±4%
Wall Street Journal/Zogby Interactive	October 13–18	47.6%	50.7%	1.1%	3.1	1,038 LV	±3.0%
Wall Street Journal/Zogby Interactive	September 30–October 5	47.6%	49.8%	1.3%	2.2	1,088 LV	±3.0%
Wall Street Journal/Zogby Interactive	September 13–17	46.1%	51.5%	1.1%	5.4	1,037 LV	±3.0%
Mason-Dixon Polling & Research	September 14–16	41%	48%	1%	7	625 LV	±4%
Wall Street Journal/Zogby Interactive	August 30–September 3	48.9%	48.5%	1.1%	0.4	1,061 LV	±3.0%
Los Angeles Times	August 21–24	42%	46%	3%	4	580 RV	±4%
Wall Street Journal/Zogby Interactive	August 16–21	49.3%	48.8%	0.9%	0.5	852 LV	±3.4%
Wall Street Journal/Zogby Interactive	July 26–30	48.8%	48.2%	0.8%	0.6	949 LV	±3.2%
Wall Street Journal/Zogby Interactive	July 19–23	48.8%	48.1%	1.5%	0.7	959 LV	±3.1%
CNN/USA Today/Gallup	July 19–22	47%	47%	3%	Tied	636 LV	±5%
Kansas City Star/Market Research Institute	July 13–20	46%	44%	1%	2	600 RV	±4%
Wall Street Journal/Zogby Interactive	July 6–10	50.1%	46.8%	0.7%	3.3	849 LV	±3.3%
Wall Street Journal/Zogby Interactive	June 15–20	47.9%	48.6%	1%	0.7	989 LV	±3.1%
Los Angeles Times	June 5–8	37%	48%	5%	11	566 RV	±4%
Wall Street Journal/Zogby Interactive	June 1–6	47.6%	48.6%	0.9%	1	1,342 LV	±2.7%
Wall Street Journal/Zogby Interactive	May 18–23	47.2%	43.9%	2.1%	3.3	520 LV	±4.3%
Suffolk University	February 28–March 2	39%	50%	5%	11	420 LV	Not reported

=== Montana ===
3 electoral votes
(Republican in 1996)
(Republican in 2000)

Poll Source	Date administered (2004)	John Kerry	George W. Bush	Margin	Sample size	Margin of error
Billings Gazette/Mason-Dixon Polling & Research	December 8–10, 2003	26%	58%	32	625 LV	±4%

Three-way race

Poll Source	Date administered (2004)	John Kerry	George W. Bush	Ralph Nader	Margin	Sample size	Margin of error
Lee Newspapers/Mason-Dixon Polling & Research	October 18–20	36%	57%	1%	21	625 LV	±4%
Lee Newspapers/Mason-Dixon Polling & Research	September 20–22	36%	54%	2%	18	625 LV	±4%
American Research Group	September 7–9	32%	60%	3%	28	600 LV	±4%
Lee Newspapers/Mason-Dixon Polling & Research	May 24–26	33%	53%	6%	20	625 RV	±4%

Six-way race

Poll Source	Date administered (2004)	John Kerry	George W. Bush	Ralph Nader	David Cobb	Michael Badnarik	Michael Peroutka	Margin	Sample size	Margin of error
Montana State University Billings	October 7–10	34.3%	55.3%	2.2%	0%	0%	0.7%	21	411 LV	±5%

=== Nebraska ===
5 electoral votes
(Republican in 1996)
(Republican in 2000)

Poll Source	Date administered (2004)	John Kerry	George W. Bush	Margin	Sample size	Margin of error
Omaha World-Herald/RKM Research Communications	October 15–20	32%	61%	29	1,007 LV	±3.1%

Three-way race

Poll Source	Date administered (2004)	John Kerry	George W. Bush	Ralph Nader	Margin	Sample size	Margin of error
American Research Group	September 9–12	30%	61%	2%	31	600 LV	±4%

1st congressional district

Poll Source	Date administered (2004)	John Kerry	George W. Bush	Margin	Sample size	Margin of error
Omaha World-Herald/RKM Research Communications	October 15–20	34%	57%	23	Not reported	±6.2%

2nd congressional district

Poll Source	Date administered (2004)	John Kerry	George W. Bush	Margin	Sample size	Margin of error
Omaha World-Herald/RKM Research Communications	October 15–20	36%	57%	21	Not reported	±4.4%

3rd congressional district

Poll Source	Date administered (2004)	John Kerry	George W. Bush	Margin	Sample size	Margin of error
Omaha World-Herald/RKM Research Communications	October 15–20	25%	68%	43	Not reported	±6.2%

=== Nevada ===
5 electoral votes
(Democrat in 1996)
(Republican in 2000)

Poll Source	Date administered (2004)	John Kerry	George W. Bush	Margin	Sample size	Margin of error
KVBC-TV Las Vegas/SurveyUSA	October 30–November 1	45%	53%	8	636 LV	±4%
Zogby International (Daily Tracking)	October 29–November 1	45%	50%	5	603 LV	±4.1%
KVBC-TV Las Vegas/SurveyUSA	October 28–29	49%	49%	Tied	535 LV	±4.3%
MSNBC/Knight-Ridder/Mason-Dixon Polling & Research	October 27–29	44%	50%	6	625 LV	±4%
Zogby International (Daily Tracking)	October 25–28	45%	50%	5	600 LV	±4.1%
Zogby International (Daily Tracking)	October 21–24	44%	48%	4	601 LV	±4.1%
Rasmussen Reports/Pulse Opinion Research	October 23	47%	49%	2	500 LV	±4.5%
KVBC-TV Las Vegas/SurveyUSA	October 16–18	45%	52%	7	585 LV	±4.1%
KVBC-TV Las Vegas/SurveyUSA	October 1–3	46%	50%	4	625 LV	±4%
CNN/USA Today/Gallup	September 18–21	43%	52%	9	534 LV	±5%
KVBC-TV Las Vegas/SurveyUSA	September 11–13	47%	54%	4	526 LV	±4.4%
KVBC-TV Las Vegas/SurveyUSA	August 14–16	46%	49%	3	520 LV	±4.4%
KVBC-TV Las Vegas/SurveyUSA	July 20–22	49%	45%	4	801 LV	±3.5%
National Republican Committee/Public Opinion Strategies (R)	June 1–6	45.4%	46.1%	0.7	800 LV	±3.46%
KVBC-TV Las Vegas/SurveyUSA	February 11–12	48%	49%	1	505 RV	±4.5%

Three-way race

Poll Source	Date administered (2004)	John Kerry	George W. Bush	Ralph Nader	Michael Badnarik	Margin	Sample size	Margin of error
MSNBC/Knight-Ridder/Mason-Dixon Polling & Research	October 15–18	42%	52%	1%	N/A	10	600 LV	±4%
Wall Street Journal/Zogby Interactive	October 13–18	45.9%	49.8%	0.4%	N/A	3.9	516 LV	±4.3%
Wall Street Journal/Zogby Interactive	September 30–October 5	48.1%	47.1%	0.9%	N/A	1	519 LV	±4.3%
Las Vegas Sun/KLAS-TV Channel 8/KNPR Nevada Public Radio/Belden Russonello & Stewart	September 20−28	44%	48%	2%	N/A	4	600 LV	±4%
Badnarik for President/Rasmussen Reports/Pulse Opinion Research (L)	September 23	46%	47%	N/A	3%	1	500 LV	±4.5%
Wall Street Journal/Zogby Interactive	September 13–17	46.6%	48.8%	1.2%	N/A	2.2	499 LV	±4.4%
MSNBC/Knight-Ridder/Mason-Dixon Polling & Research	September 13–14	45%	50%	1%	N/A	5	625 LV	±4%
American Research Group	September 12–14	45%	47%	1%	N/A	2	600 LV	±4%
Wall Street Journal/Zogby Interactive	August 30–September 3	47.4%	46.8%	1.6%	N/A	0.6	564 LV	±4.1%
Wall Street Journal/Zogby Interactive	August 16–21	47.7%	46%	2.3%	N/A	1.7	501 LV	±4.4%
Badnarik for President/Rasmussen Reports/Pulse Opinion Research (L)	August 15/16	46%	47%	N/A	3%	1	500 LV	±4.5%
Wall Street Journal/Zogby Interactive	July 26–30	45.4%	46%	1.1%	N/A	0.6	505 LV	±4.4%
Wall Street Journal/Zogby Interactive	July 19–23	46.8%	46.2%	0.6%	N/A	0.6	503 LV	±4.4%
Las Vegas Review-Journal/Mason-Dixon Polling & Research	July 20–22	43%	46%	4%	N/A	3	625 LV	±4%
Wall Street Journal/Zogby Interactive	July 6–10	43.3%	45.1%	5.9%	N/A	1.8	513 LV	±4.3%
Wall Street Journal/Zogby Interactive	June 15–20	44.8%	47.3%	4.4%	N/A	2.5	512 LV	±4.3%
Wall Street Journal/Zogby Interactive	June 1–6	47.3%	43.8%	2%	N/A	3.5	472 LV	±4.5%
Wall Street Journal/Zogby Interactive	May 18–23	47.3%	43.5%	2.8%	N/A	3.8	532 LV	±4.3%
Las Vegas Review-Journal/Mason-Dixon Polling & Research	March 15–17	38%	49%	4%	N/A	11	625 LV	±4%

Four-way race

Poll Source	Date administered (2004)	John Kerry	George W. Bush	Ralph Nader	Michael Badnarik	Margin	Sample size	Margin of error
Las Vegas Sun/KLAS-TV Channel 8/KNPR Nevada Public Radio/Belden Russonello & Stewart	October 16–19	43%	47%	1%	1%	4	600 LV	±4%

=== New Hampshire ===
5 electoral votes
(Democrat in 1996)
(Republican in 2000)

Poll Source	Date administered (2004)	John Kerry	George W. Bush	Margin	Sample size	Margin of error
American Research Group	October 30–November 1	49%	49%	Tied	600 LV	±4%
MSNBC/Knight-Ridder/Mason-Dixon Polling & Research	October 27–29	47%	46%	1	625 LV	±4%
American Research Group	October 16–18	47%	47%	Tied	600 LV	±4%
American Research Group	October 3–5	47%	47%	Tied	600 LV	±4%
America Coming Together/Lake, Snell, Perry & Associates (D)	September 20–23	47%	47%	Tied	Not reported	±5%
American Research Group	August 3–5	50%	43%	7	600 LV	±4%
American Research Group	July 19–21	48%	46%	2	600 LV	±4%
WMUR/University of New Hampshire	July 6–20	50%	45%	5	459 LV	±4.5%
Becker Institute	June 18–20	48%	45%	3	401 RV	±4.8%
American Research Group	June 7–9	47%	47%	Tied	600 LV	±4%
National Republican Committee/Public Opinion Strategies (R)	June 1–6	45.3%	44.7%	0.6	800 LV	±3.46%
University of New Hampshire	April 19–26	49%	45%	4	491 LV	±4.4%
Rasmussen Reports/Pulse Opinion Research	April 21	47%	45%	2	500 LV	±4.5%
American Research Group	March 30–April 1	45%	48%	3	600 LV	±4%
American Research Group	March 15–18	45%	47%	2	463 RV	±4.6%
University of New Hampshire	February 4–12	53%	38%	15	464 RV	Not reported
University of New Hampshire	September 30–October 7, 2003	38%	49%	11	498 A	±4.4%

Three-way race

Poll Source	Date administered (2004)	John Kerry	George W. Bush	Ralph Nader	Margin	Sample size	Margin of error
American Research Group	October 30–November 1	48%	49%	1%	1	600 LV	±4%
WMUR/University of New Hampshire (Daily Tracking)	October 28–30	49%	48%	2%	1	716 LV	±3.7%
Wall Street Journal/Zogby Interactive	October 25–30	50.2%	45.7%	1%	4.5	631 LV	±3.9%
Franklin Pierce College	October 25–27	50.1%	42.5%	1%	7.6	621 LV	±4%
WMUR/University of New Hampshire (Daily Tracking)	October 25–27	50%	46%	1%	4	758 LV	±3.6%
Franklin Pierce College	October 18–21	50.1%	41.3%	1.3%	8.8	453 LV	±4.6%
Rasmussen Reports/Pulse Opinion Research	October 18	49%	47%	1%	2	500 LV	±4.5%
American Research Group	October 16–18	46%	47%	1%	1	600 LV	±4%
Wall Street Journal/Zogby Interactive	October 13–18	51.1%	46%	1.1%	5.1	510 LV	±4.3%
7NEWS/Suffolk University	October 14–17	46%	41%	1%	5	400 LV	±4.9%
MSNBC/Knight-Ridder/Mason-Dixon Polling & Research	October 14–16	45%	48%	1%	3	625 LV	±4%
American Research Group	October 3–5	47%	47%	1%	Tied	600 LV	±4%
Wall Street Journal/Zogby Interactive	September 30–October 5	50.5%	43.9%	1.7%	6.6	576 LV	±4.1%
Franklin Pierce College	October 3–4	49.1%	42.3%	1.1%	6.8	617 LV	±4%
WMUR/University of New Hampshire	September 27–October 3	45%	50%	1%	5	521 LV	±4.3%
Becker Institute	October 2	49%	43%	2%	6	397 RV	Not reported
American Research Group	September 15–17	45%	47%	1%	2	600 LV	±4%
Wall Street Journal/Zogby Interactive	September 13–17	48.1%	44.5%	1.6%	3.6	538 LV	±4.2%
Rasmussen Reports/Pulse Opinion Research	September 15	51%	45%	3%	6	500 LV	±4.5%
MSNBC/Knight-Ridder/Mason-Dixon Polling & Research	September 13–15	40%	49%	3%	9	624 LV	±4%
Wall Street Journal/Zogby Interactive	August 30–September 3	49.5%	44.8%	1.2%	4.7	553 LV	±4.2%
Wall Street Journal/Zogby Interactive	August 16–21	50.5%	43.3%	1.4%	7.2	512 LV	±4.3%
American Research Group	August 3–5	49%	42%	2%	7	600 LV	±4%
Wall Street Journal/Zogby Interactive	July 26–30	50.7%	41.8%	2.3%	8.9	552 LV	±4.2%
Wall Street Journal/Zogby Interactive	July 19–23	47.3%	42.7%	3.1%	4.6	548 LV	±4.2%
American Research Group	July 19–21	47%	45%	2%	2	600 LV	±4%
WMUR/University of New Hampshire	July 6–20	47%	43%	4%	4	459 LV	±4.5%
Wall Street Journal/Zogby Interactive	July 6–10	49.3%	40.3%	0.8%	9	527 LV	±4.3%
Becker Institute	June 18–20	44%	45%	4%	1	401 RV	±4.8%
Wall Street Journal/Zogby Interactive	June 15–20	46.2%	42.9%	1.7%	3.3	500 LV	±4.4%
American Research Group	June 7–9	46%	46%	2%	Tied	600 LV	±4%
Wall Street Journal/Zogby Interactive	June 1–6	48.7%	44.4%	1.7%	4.3	503 LV	±4.4%
Wall Street Journal/Zogby Interactive	May 18–23	49.5%	39.9%	2.2%	9.6	521 LV	±4.3%
American Research Group	March 30–April 1	43%	48%	3%	5	600 LV	±4%
American Research Group	March 15–18	39%	45%	8%	6	463 RV	±4.6%

=== New Jersey ===
15 electoral votes
(Democrat in 1996)
(Democrat in 2000)

Poll Source	Date administered (2004)	John Kerry	George W. Bush	Margin	Sample size	Margin of error
Rasmussen Reports/Pulse Opinion Research	October 17–30	53%	41%	12	400 LV	±5%
The Star-Ledger/Rutgers University	October 27–29	45%	41%	4	740 LV	±3.6%
WABC-TV New York/WCAU-TV Philadelphia/SurveyUSA	October 27–29	54%	42%	12	794 LV	±3.5%
Fairleigh Dickinson University (PublicMind)	October 21–28	47%	40%	7	549 LV	±4.5%
WABC-TV New York/WCAU-TV Philadelphia/SurveyUSA	October 16–18	51%	43%	8	703 LV	±3.8%
Quinnipiac University	October 14–17	50%	45%	5	786 LV	±3.5%
The Star-Ledger/Rutgers University	October 14–17	51%	38%	13	663 LV	Not reported
Fairleigh Dickinson University (PublicMind)	October 7–11	48%	43%	5	500 LV	±4.5%
Rasmussen Reports/Pulse Opinion Research	September 26−October 10	53%	44%	9	400 LV	±5%
The Star-Ledger/Rutgers University	October 1–6	47%	41%	6	571 LV	±4.1%
Fairleigh Dickinson University (PublicMind)	October 1–6	49%	41%	8	500 LV	±4.5%
Quinnipiac University	October 1–4	49%	46%	3	819 LV	±3.4%
WABC-TV New York/WCAU-TV Philadelphia/SurveyUSA	October 1–3	50%	45%	5	696 LV	±3.8%
Rasmussen Reports/Pulse Opinion Research	September 12–25	49%	46%	3	400 LV	±5%
Quinnipiac University	September 16–19	49%	48%	1	672 LV	±3.8%
WABC-TV New York/WCAU-TV Philadelphia/SurveyUSA	September 12–14	45%	49%	4	734 LV	±3.7%
Rasmussen Reports/Pulse Opinion Research	August 1–26	51%	43%	8	Not reported	±5%
Quinnipiac University	August 19–23	51%	39%	12	887 RV	±3.3%
Quinnipiac University	July 30–August 2	52%	38%	14	996 RV	±3.1%
Rasmussen Reports/Pulse Opinion Research	July 1–31	51%	38%	13	Not reported	±5%
Fairleigh Dickinson University (PublicMind)	July 20–26	45%	43%	2	834 RV	±3.5%
Rasmussen Reports/Pulse Opinion Research	June 1–30	51%	41%	10	Not reported	±5%
Quinnipiac University	June 15–20	49%	41%	8	1,167 RV	±2.9%
National Republican Committee/Public Opinion Strategies (R)	June 1–6	48.8%	41.7%	7.1	800 LV	±3.46%
Rasmussen Reports/Pulse Opinion Research	May 1–31	51%	39%	12	Not reported	±5%
Quinnipiac University	May 10–16	47%	44%	3	1,122 RV	±2.9%
The Star-Ledger/Rutgers University	April 28–May 4	43%	37%	6	643 RV	±4%
Rasmussen Reports/Pulse Opinion Research	April 20	51%	39%	12	500 LV	±4.5%
Fairleigh Dickinson University (PublicMind)	April 3–10	48%	47%	1	802 RV	±3.5%
Quinnipiac University	November 6–10, 2003	45%	46%	1	1,027 RV	±3.1%
Quinnipiac University	September 18–22, 2003	43%	48%	5	968 RV	±3.2%
Quinnipiac University	June 11–16, 2003	37%	53%	16	815 RV	±3.4%

Three-way race

Poll Source	Date administered (2004)	John Kerry	George W. Bush	Ralph Nader	Margin	Sample size	Margin of error
Quinnipiac University	October 27–31	48%	43%	2%	5	984 LV	±3.1%
Quinnipiac University	October 21–25	46%	46%	2%	Tied	852 LV	±3.4%
Fairleigh Dickinson University (PublicMind)	October 13–21	49%	41%	1%	8	503 LV	±4.5%
Quinnipiac University	October 14–17	49%	45%	1%	4	786 LV	±3.5%
Quinnipiac University	October 1–4	49%	46%	2%	3	819 LV	±3.4%
Fairleigh Dickinson University (PublicMind)	September 23–28	45%	44%	2%	1	489 LV	±4.5%
Quinnipiac University	September 16–19	48%	48%	2%	Tied	672 LV	±3.8%
American Research Group	September 13–16	50%	42%	1%	8	600 LV	±4%
The Star-Ledger/Rutgers University	September 3–7	43%	39%	5%	4	738 RV	±3.5%
Quinnipiac University	August 19–23	49%	39%	4%	10	887 RV	±3.3%
Quinnipiac University	July 30–August 2	49%	36%	6%	13	996 RV	±3.1%
The Star-Ledger/Rutgers University	July 30	52%	32%	6%	20	624 RV	±4%
Fairleigh Dickinson University (PublicMind)	July 20–26	42%	41%	6%	1	834 RV	±3.5%
Quinnipiac University	June 15–20	46%	40%	7%	6	1,167 RV	±2.9%
Quinnipiac University	May 10–16	46%	43%	5%	3	1,122 RV	±2.9%
Fairleigh Dickinson University (PublicMind)	April 3–10	44%	48%	5%	4	802 RV	±3.5%

=== New Mexico ===
5 electoral votes
(Democrat in 1996)
(Democrat in 2000)

Poll Source	Date administered (2004)	John Kerry	George W. Bush	Margin	Sample size	Margin of error
Reuters/Zogby International (Daily Tracking)	October 29–November 1	51%	48%	3	600 LV	±4.1%
American Research Group	October 27–30	48%	48%	Tied	600 LV	±4%
Santa Fe New Mexican/KOB-TV/Mason-Dixon Polling & Research	October 27–29	45%	49%	4	625 LV	±4%
Reuters/Zogby International (Daily Tracking)	October 25–28	43%	49%	6	603 LV	±4.1%
Reuters/Zogby International (Daily Tracking)	October 21–24	44%	49%	5	602 LV	±4.1%
American Research Group	October 16–18	48%	47%	1	600 LV	±4%
Santa Fe New Mexican/KOB-TV/Mason-Dixon Polling & Research	October 15–18	44%	49%	5	625 LV	±4%
American Research Group	August 17–19	52%	42%	10	600 LV	±4%
American Research Group	July 6–8	51%	43%	8	600 LV	±4%
National Republican Committee/Public Opinion Strategies (R)	June 1–6	47.1%	43.7%	3.4	800 LV	±3.46%
American Research Group	March 30–April 1	47%	47%	Tied	600 LV	±4%

Three-way race

Poll Source	Date administered (2004)	John Kerry	George W. Bush	Ralph Nader	Michael Badnarik	Margin	Sample size	Margin of error
American Research Group	October 27–30	48%	47%	1%	N/A	1	600 LV	±4%
American Research Group	October 16–18	48%	46%	1%	N/A	2	600 LV	±4%
Wall Street Journal/Zogby Interactive	October 13–18	53.6%	44.1%	1%	N/A	9.5	526 LV	±4.3%
CNN/USA Today/Gallup	October 3–6	47%	50%	2%	N/A	3	673 LV	±4%
Wall Street Journal/Zogby Interactive	September 30–October 5	53.9%	42.5%	1.7%	N/A	11.4	541 LV	±4.2%
America Coming Together/Hart Research Associates (D)	October 2–4	49%	45%	1%	N/A	4	802 RV	±4%
Wall Street Journal/Zogby Interactive	September 13–17	54.3%	41.6%	2.2%	N/A	12.7	576 LV	±4.1%
Santa Fe New Mexican/KOB-TV/Mason-Dixon Polling & Research	September 15–16	43%	47%	2%	N/A	4	625 LV	±4%
American Research Group	September 14–16	49%	44%	1%	N/A	5	600 LV	±4%
Wall Street Journal/Zogby Interactive	August 30–September 3	53.6%	43.9%	1.1%	N/A	9.7	546 LV	±4.2%
Wall Street Journal/Zogby Interactive	August 16–21	49.7%	44.1%	0.7%	N/A	5.6	507 LV	±4.4%
American Research Group	August 17–19	49%	42%	2%	N/A	7	600 LV	±4%
Badnarik for President/Rasmussen Reports/Pulse Opinion Research (L)	August 15	46%	46%	N/A	4%	Tied	500 LV	±4.5%
Badnarik for President/Rasmussen Reports/Pulse Opinion Research (L)	August 4	50%	43%	N/A	5%	7	500 LV	±4.5%
Wall Street Journal/Zogby Interactive	July 26–30	49.1%	47.6%	0.5%	N/A	1.5	505 LV	±4.4%
Wall Street Journal/Zogby Interactive	July 19–23	52%	42.2%	0.9%	N/A	9.8	499 LV	±4.4%
Wall Street Journal/Zogby Interactive	July 6–10	49.4%	42.1%	2.9%	N/A	7.3	516 LV	±4.3%
American Research Group	July 6–8	49%	42%	3%	N/A	7	600 LV	±4%
Wall Street Journal/Zogby Interactive	June 15–20	50.1%	43.2%	1.4%	N/A	6.9	505 LV	±4.4%
Wall Street Journal/Zogby Interactive	June 1–6	47.7%	48.1%	2.1%	N/A	0.4	558 LV	±4.2%
Wall Street Journal/Zogby Interactive	May 18–23	48.4%	43.3%	2.9%	N/A	5.1	454 LV	±4.6%
American Research Group	March 30–April 1	45%	46%	3%	N/A	1	600 LV	±4%

Four-way race

Poll Source	Date administered (2004)	John Kerry	George W. Bush	Ralph Nader	Michael Badnarik	Margin	Sample size	Margin of error
Albuquerque Journal/Research & Polling Inc.	October 26–29	44%	47%	1%	1%	3	Not reported	±3%
Badnarik for President/Rasmussen Reports/Pulse Opinion Research (L)	October 26	44%	48%	2%	1%	4	500 LV	±4.5%
Albuquerque Journal/Research & Polling Inc.	August 27–September 1	42%	45%	1%	1%	3	908 LV	±3%

Five-way race

Poll Source	Date administered (2004)	John Kerry	George W. Bush	Ralph Nader	Michael Badnarik	David Cobb	Margin	Sample size	Margin of error
Albuquerque Journal/Research & Polling Inc.	October 1–4	46%	43%	2%	1%	0%	3	872 LV	±3%

=== New York ===
31 electoral votes
(Democrat in 1996)
(Democrat in 2000)

Poll Source	Date administered (2004)	John Kerry	George W. Bush	Margin	Sample size	Margin of error
WABC-TV New York City/WRGB-TV Albany/WGRZ-TV Buffalo/SurveyUSA	October 26–28	57%	39%	18	628 LV	±4%
Siena College	October 25–28	52%	37%	15	1,062 LV	±3.0%
Rasmussen Reports/Pulse Opinion Research	October 16–22	57%	36%	21	Not reported	±3%
WABC-TV New York City/WRGB-TV Albany/WGRZ-TV Buffalo/SurveyUSA	October 9–11	58%	35%	23	606 LV	±4.1%
Rasmussen Reports/Pulse Opinion Research	September 19–25	53%	41%	12	Not reported	±3%
WABC-TV New York City/WRGB-TV Albany/WGRZ-TV Buffalo/SurveyUSA	September 18–20	55%	39%	16	582 LV	±4.2%
Quinnipiac University	September 7–12	49%	42%	7	1,438 RV	±2.6%
Rasmussen Reports/Pulse Opinion Research	August 1–26	56%	37%	19	Not reported	±3%
Quinnipiac University	August 3–9	55%	35%	20	1,161 RV	±2.9%
Siena College	July 12–15	51%	29%	22	604 RV	±4.0%
Rasmussen Reports/Pulse Opinion Research	June 1–30	58%	30%	28	Not reported	±3%
Quinnipiac University	June 9–14	55%	36%	19	1,466 RV	±2.6%
Rasmussen Reports/Pulse Opinion Research	May 1–31	57%	34%	23	Not reported	±3%
Marist College	April 13–15	56%	38%	18	602 RV	±4%
Quinnipiac University	April 5–12	53%	36%	17	1,279 RV	±2.7%
Quinnipiac University	October 29–November 3, 2003	50%	42%	8	1,304 RV	±2.7%
Quinnipiac University	September 23–29, 2003	48%	43%	5	1,201 RV	±2.8%
Quinnipiac University	June 18–23, 2003	43%	48%	5	1,095 RV	±3%
Quinnipiac University	April 15–21, 2003	38%	50%	12	885 RV	±3.3%

Three-way race

Poll Source	Date administered (2004)	John Kerry	George W. Bush	Ralph Nader	Margin	Sample size	Margin of error
Marist College	October 25–26	57%	39%	1%	18	636 LV	±4%
Siena College	September 20–23	51%	31%	2%	20	1,121 LV	±2.9%
Rasmussen Reports/Pulse Opinion Research	September 12–18	49%	44%	2%	5	500 LV	±4.5%
American Research Group	September 14–16	52%	40%	1%	12	600 LV	±4%
Marist College	September 13–14	52%	41%	3%	11	584 LV	±4%
Quinnipiac University	September 7–12	47%	41%	4%	6	1,438 RV	±2.6%
Quinnipiac University	August 3–9	53%	35%	4%	18	1,161 RV	±2.9%
Quinnipiac University	June 9–14	52%	34%	7%	18	1,466 RV	±2.6%
Siena College	April 19–22	51%	32%	1%	19	625 RV	±3.9%
Marist College	April 13–15	54%	37%	5%	17	602 RV	±4%
Quinnipiac University	April 5–12	49%	35%	6%	14	1,279 RV	±2.7%

=== North Carolina ===
15 electoral votes
(Republican in 1996)
(Republican in 2000)

Poll Source	Date administered (2004)	John Kerry	George W. Bush	Margin	Sample size	Margin of error
WBTV-Charlotte/WTVD-TV Raleigh-Durham/SurveyUSA	October 29–31	45%	53%	8	620 LV	±4%
Rasmussen Reports/Pulse Opinion Research	October 24–30	43%	53%	10	Not reported	±5%
WRAL/Winston-Salem Journal/Mason-Dixon Polling & Research	October 25–26	43%	52%	9	625 LV	±4%
WBTV-Charlotte/WTVD-TV Raleigh-Durham/SurveyUSA	October 22–24	44%	54%	10	694 LV	±3.8%
John Locke Foundation/Tel Opinion Research (R)	October 18–20	40%	48%	8	600 LV	±4%
Mason-Dixon Polling & Research	October 18–19	43%	51%	8	625 LV	±4%
Zogby Interactive	October 13–18	47%	51%	4	Not reported	Not reported
WBTV-Charlotte/WTVD-TV Raleigh-Durham/SurveyUSA	October 15–17	47%	50%	3	627 LV	±4%
Zogby Interactive	September 30–October 6	47%	50%	3	Not reported	Not reported
WBTV-Charlotte/WTVD-TV Raleigh-Durham/SurveyUSA	October 2–4	45%	52%	7	628 LV	±4%
Rasmussen Reports/Pulse Opinion Research	September 23–29	42%	54%	12	500 LV	±4.5%
WRAL/Winston-Salem Journal/Mason-Dixon Polling & Research	September 26–28	43%	52%	9	625 LV	±4%
Burr for Senate/Public Opinion Strategies (R)	September 26–27	41%	53%	12	Not reported	±4%
Zogby Interactive	September 13–17	47%	52%	5	Not reported	Not reported
American Research Group	September 13–16	44%	49%	5	600 LV	±4%
Rasmussen Reports/Pulse Opinion Research	September 4–10	42%	55%	13	445 LV	±5%
WBTV-Charlotte/WTVD-TV Raleigh-Durham/SurveyUSA	September 6–8	46%	50%	4	587 LV	±4.2%
Rasmussen Reports/Pulse Opinion Research	August 1–26	43%	53%	10	Not reported	±5%
WBTV-Charlotte/WTVD-TV Raleigh-Durham/SurveyUSA	August 13–15	45%	51%	6	592 LV	±4.1%
Rasmussen Reports/Pulse Opinion Research	July 1–31	45%	50%	5	Not reported	±5%
WBTV-Charlotte/WTVD-TV Raleigh-Durham/SurveyUSA	July 24–26	44%	51%	7	906 LV	±3.3%
CNN/USA Today/Gallup	July 9–11	41%	56%	15	680 LV	±5%
Rasmussen Reports/Pulse Opinion Research	June 1–30	42%	49%	7	Not reported	±5%
National Republican Committee/Public Opinion Strategies (R)	June 1–6	43.2%	49.1%	5.9	800 LV	±3.46%
Rasmussen Reports/Pulse Opinion Research	May 1–31	44%	48%	4	Not reported	±5%
Rasmussen Reports/Pulse Opinion Research	March 1–13	43%	51%	8	400 LV	±5%
WBTV-Charlotte/WTVD-TV Raleigh-Durham/SurveyUSA	February 23–25	42%	53%	11	654 RV	±3.9%

Three-way race

Poll Source	Date administered (2004)	John Kerry	George W. Bush	Ralph Nader	Michael Badnarik	Margin	Sample size	Margin of error
League of Conservation Voters/Fairbank, Maslin, Maullin & Associates (D)	July 19–22	44%	48%	3%	N/A	4	600 LV	±4.0%
WRAL-Winston-Salem Journal/Mason-Dixon Polling & Research	July 12–13	45%	48%	N/A	0%	3	625 LV	±4%
CNN/USA Today/Gallup	July 9–11	39%	54%	4%	N/A	15	680 LV	±5%
WRAL/Winston-Salem Journal/Mason-Dixon Polling & Research	May 14–17	41%	48%	3%	N/A	7	625 RV	±4%

=== North Dakota ===
3 electoral votes
(Republican in 1996)
(Republican in 2000)

Poll Source	Date administered (2004)	John Kerry	George W. Bush	Ralph Nader	Margin	Sample size	Margin of error
The Forum/WDAY-TV/Minnesota State University Moorhead	October 18–19	35%	55%	>1%	20	623 LV	±4%
American Research Group	September 9–12	33%	62%	1%	29	600 LV	±4%

=== Ohio ===
20 electoral votes
(Democrat in 1996)
(Republican in 2000)

Poll Source	Date administered (2004)	John Kerry	George W. Bush	Margin	Sample size	Margin of error
Reuters/Zogby International (Daily Tracking)	October 29–November 1	43%	49%	6	602 LV	±4.1%
Fox News/Opinion Dynamics Corporation	October 30–31	47%	50%	3	700 LV	±3.7%
WCPO-TV Cincinnati/WKYC-TV Cleveland/SurveyUSA	October 29–31	47%	49%	2	816 LV	±3.5%
CNN/USA Today/Gallup	October 28–31	50%	46%	4	1,111 LV	±3%
University of Cincinnati	October 27–31	49.2%	50.1%	0.9	877 LV	±3.3%
MSNBC/Knight-Ridder/Mason-Dixon Polling & Research	October 27–29	46%	48%	2	625 LV	±4%
Reuters/Zogby International (Daily Tracking)	October 25–28	47%	44%	3	601 LV	±4%
Plain Dealer/Mason-Dixon Polling & Research	October 26–28	45%	48%	3	1,500 LV	±2.6%
Los Angeles Times	October 22–26	50%	44%	6	585 LV	±4%
Rasmussen Reports/Pulse Opinion Research (Daily Tracking)	October 20–26	46%	50%	4	537 LV	±4%
WCPO-TV Cincinnati/WKYC-TV Cleveland/SurveyUSA	October 23–25	50%	47%	3	831 LV	±3.5%
American Research Group	October 23–25	49%	47%	2	600 LV	±4%
Reuters/Zogby International (Daily Tracking)	October 21–24	42%	47%	5	603 LV	±4.1%
Ohio University	October 17–21	50%	46%	4	358 LV	±5.3%
CNN/USA Today/Gallup	October 18–20	49%	48%	1	706 LV	±4%
Fox News/Opinion Dynamics Corporation	October 17–18	44%	49%	5	800 LV	±3.5%
WCPO-TV Cincinnati/WKYC-TV Cleveland/SurveyUSA	October 16–18	49%	47%	2	698 LV	±3.8%
MSNBC/Knight-Ridder/Mason-Dixon Polling & Research	October 15–18	45%	46%	1	625 LV	±4%
Rasmussen Reports/Pulse Opinion Research (Daily Tracking)	October 12–18	47%	47%	Tied	537 LV	±4%
ABC News	October 14–17	50%	47%	3	789 LV	±3.5%
University of Cincinnati	October 11–17	48%	46%	2	757 LV	±3.6%
Rasmussen Reports/Pulse Opinion Research (Daily Tracking)	October 7–13	47%	49%	2	564 LV	±4%
Chicago Tribune/Market Shares Corporation	October 8–11	49%	45%	4	500 LV	±4.4%
American Research Group	October 4–6	48%	48%	Tied	600 LV	±4%
WCPO-TV Cincinnati/WKYC-TV Cleveland/SurveyUSA	October 2–4	49%	48%	1	761 LV	±3.6%
Rasmussen Reports/Pulse Opinion Research (Daily Tracking)	September 25–October 2	47%	48%	1	597 LV	±4%
CNN/USA Today/Gallup	September 25–28	48%	50%	2	664 LV	±4%
Rasmussen Reports/Pulse Opinion Research (Daily Tracking)	September 17–23	45%	48%	3	Not reported	±3%
Fox News/Opinion Dynamics Corporation	September 21–22	45%	48%	3	800 LV	±3.5%
Rasmussen Reports/Pulse Opinion Research (Daily Tracking)	September 12–18	45%	48%	3	668 LV	±4%
WCPO-TV Cincinnati/WKYC-TV Cleveland/SurveyUSA	September 6–8	47%	50%	3	709 LV	±3.8%
CNN/USA Today/Gallup	September 3–7	44%	52%	8	661 LV	±4%
Rasmussen Reports/Pulse Opinion Research	August 1–26	48%	46%	2	Not reported	±4%
Los Angeles Times	August 21–24	44%	49%	5	507 RV	±4%
CNN/USA Today/Gallup	August 13–15	48%	46%	2	628 LV	±5%
American Research Group	August 9–11	48%	45%	3	600 LV	±4%
Rasmussen Reports/Pulse Opinion Research	July 1–31	46%	45%	1	Not reported	±4%
American Research Group	July 20–22	48%	46%	2	600 LV	±4%
CNN/USA Today/Gallup	July 19–22	51%	45%	6	639 LV	±5%
Rasmussen Reports/Pulse Opinion Research	June 1–30	42%	46%	4	Not reported	±4%
Fox News/Opinion Dynamics Corporation	June 22–23	43%	47%	4	750 RV	±4%
American Research Group	June 21–23	50%	44%	6	600 LV	±4%
National Republican Committee/Public Opinion Strategies (R)	June 1–6	43.7%	47.1%	3.4	1,200 LV	±2.83%
Rasmussen Reports/Pulse Opinion Research	May 1–31	44%	46%	2	Not reported	±4%
American Research Group	May 10–12	50%	43%	7	600 LV	±4%
Columbus Dispatch	March 23–31	45%	46%	1	3,344 RV	±2%
Rasmussen Reports/Pulse Opinion Research	March 14–16	45%	41%	4	500 LV	±4.5%

Three-way race

Poll Source	Date administered (2004)	John Kerry	George W. Bush	Ralph Nader	Margin	Sample size	Margin of error
CNN/USA Today/Gallup	October 18–20	48%	47%	1%	1	706 LV	±4%
Fox News/Opinion Dynamics Corporation	October 17–18	45%	47%	3%	2	800 LV	±3.5%
Wall Street Journal/Zogby Interactive	October 13–18	47.6%	50.6%	0.4%	3	2,024 LV	±2.0%
American Research Group	October 4–6	48%	47%	1%	1	600 LV	±4%
Wall Street Journal/Zogby Interactive	September 30–October 5	49.1%	48.8%	0.4%	0.3	1,844 LV	±2.3%
CNN/USA Today/Gallup	September 25–28	47%	49%	1%	2	664 LV	±4%
America Coming Together/Lake Snell Perry (D)	September 19–23	46%	46%	1%	Tied	Not reported	±3.5%
Fox News/Opinion Dynamics Corporation	September 21–22	44%	48%	2%	4	800 LV	±3.5%
American Research Group	September 17–20	46%	48%	1%	2	600 LV	±4%
University of Cincinnati	September 12–18	43%	54%	1%	11	456 LV	±4.5%
Wall Street Journal/Zogby Interactive	September 13–17	46.8%	50.1%	0.3%	3.3	1,718 LV	±2.4%
MSNBC/Knight-Ridder/Mason-Dixon Polling & Research	September 14–15	42%	49%	2%	7	624 LV	±4%
Plain Dealer/Mason-Dixon Polling & Research	September 10–14	42%	50%	2%	8	1,500 LV	±2.5%
CNN/USA Today/Gallup	September 3–7	43%	52%	2%	9	661 LV	±4%
Wall Street Journal/Zogby Interactive	August 30–September 3	42.9%	53.8%	0.5%	10.9	1,714 LV	±2.4%
Columbus Dispatch	August 18–27	46%	46%	2%	Tied	3,176 LV	±2%
Los Angeles Times	August 21–24	43%	46%	3%	3	507 RV	±4%
Wall Street Journal/Zogby Interactive	August 16–21	45.8%	51.4%	0.8%	5.6	1,392 LV	±2.6%
University of Cincinnati	August 11–17	48%	46%	1%	2	812 LV	±3.4%
CNN/USA Today/Gallup	August 13–15	47%	45%	4%	2	628 LV	±5%
American Research Group	August 9–11	48%	45%	2%	3	600 LV	±4%
Wall Street Journal/Zogby Interactive	July 26–30	46.1%	51.1%	1%	5	1,571 LV	±2.5%
Wall Street Journal/Zogby Interactive	July 19–23	46.8%	48.1%	1.2%	1.3	1,464 LV	±2.6%
Columbus Dispatch	July 14–23	44%	47%	2%	3	3,047 RV	±2%
American Research Group	July 20–22	47%	45%	3%	2	600 LV	±4%
CNN/USA Today/Gallup	July 19–22	48%	43%	5%	5	639 LV	±5%
Wall Street Journal/Zogby Interactive	July 6–10	48.6%	47.9%	0.8%	0.7	1,321 LV	±2.7%
Fox News/Opinion Dynamics Corporation	June 22–23	41%	45%	4%	4	750 RV	±4%
American Research Group	June 21–23	49%	43%	2%	6	600 LV	±4%
Wall Street Journal/Zogby Interactive	June 15–20	45.1%	50.5%	0.9%	5.4	1,552 LV	±2.5%
Los Angeles Times	June 5–8	45%	42%	4%	3	722 RV	±4%
Wall Street Journal/Zogby Interactive	June 1–6	46.3%	49.1%	1.2%	2.8	2,231 LV	±2.8%
Plain Dealer/Mason-Dixon Polling & Research	May 20–25	41%	47%	3%	6	1,500 RV	±2.6%
Wall Street Journal/Zogby Interactive	May 18–23	49.4%	44.8%	0.9%	4.6	579 LV	±4.1%
American Research Group	May 10–12	49%	42%	2%	7	600 LV	±4%
Columbus Dispatch	March 23–31	43%	45%	3%	2	3,344 RV	±2%
University of Cincinnati	March 10–22	46%	44%	5%	2	632 RV	±3.9%

Five-way race

Poll Source	Date administered (2004)	John Kerry	George W. Bush	Ralph Nader	Michael Badnarik	Michael Peroutka	Margin	Sample size	Margin of error
Columbus Dispatch	September 22–October 1	44%	51%	1%	0%	0%	7	2,859 RV	±2%

=== Oklahoma ===
7 electoral votes
(Republican in 1996)
(Republican in 2000)

Poll Source	Date administered (2004)	John Kerry	George W. Bush	Margin	Sample size	Margin of error
KFOR-TV Oklahoma City/KJRH-TV Tulsa/SurveyUSA	October 28–30	34%	64%	30	662 LV	±3.7%
KWTV/Wilson Research Strategies	October 22–24	28%	61%	33	500 LV	±4.4%
KFOR-TV Oklahoma City/KJRH-TV Tulsa/SurveyUSA	October 18–20	34%	64%	30	627 LV	±3.9%
KWTV/Wilson Research Strategies	October 15–17	31%	61%	30	500 LV	±4.4%
Cole Hargrave Snodgrass & Associates	October 10–11	30%	64%	34	500 LV	±4.3%
KWTV/Wilson Research Strategies	October 8–10	38%	50%	12	500 LV	±4.4%
KFOR-TV Oklahoma City/KJRH-TV Tulsa/SurveyUSA	October 4–6	33%	63%	30	613 LV	±3.9%
KWTV/Wilson Research Strategies	October 1–3	28%	58%	30	500 LV	±4.4%
Rasmussen Reports/Pulse Opinion Research	September 29	30%	64%	34	500 LV	±5%
KWTV/Wilson Research Strategies	September 24–26	31%	57%	26	500 LV	±4.4%
KFOR-TV Oklahoma City/KJRH-TV Tulsa/SurveyUSA	September 20–22	33%	64%	31	617 LV	±3.9%
American Research Group	September 15–20	38%	55%	17	600 LV	±4%
KWTV/Wilson Research Strategies	September 17–19	24%	64%	40	500 LV	±4.4%
KWTV/Wilson Research Strategies	September 10–12	29%	59%	30	500 LV	±4.4%
KWTV/Wilson Research Strategies	September 3–5	30%	61%	31	500 LV	±4.4%
Carson for Senate/Westhill Partners (D)	September 1–2	30%	64%	34	Not reported	Not reported
Rasmussen Reports/Pulse Opinion Research	August 1–26	36%	59%	23	Not reported	±5%
KFOR-TV Oklahoma City/KJRH-TV Tulsa/SurveyUSA	August 16–18	38%	57%	19	596 LV	±4.1%
The Oklahoman/Wilson Research Strategies	August 15–17	33%	58%	25	500 LV	±4.4%
National Republican Senatorial Committee/Basswood Research (R)	July 29	35.5%	55.5%	20	600 LV	±4.0%
KOTV/Tulsa World/Consumer Logic	July 8–12	35%	59%	24	756 RV	±3.5%
Rasmussen Reports/Pulse Opinion Research	June 1–30	31%	63%	32	Not reported	±5%
KFOR-TV Oklahoma City/KJRH-TV Tulsa/SurveyUSA	June 21–23	34%	60%	26	651 LV	±3.9%
Rasmussen Reports/Pulse Opinion Research	May 1–31	34%	58%	24	Not reported	±5%
The Oklahoman/Wilson Research Strategies	May 16–19	34%	53%	19	500 RV	±4.4%
The Oklahoman/Wilson Research Strategies	February 16–19	40%	50%	10	300 RV	±5.7%

Three-way race

Poll Source	Date administered (2004)	John Kerry	George W. Bush	Ralph Nader	Margin	Sample size	Margin of error
The Marketing Workshop/InsiderAdvantage	March 31–April 1	35%	47%	2%	12	400 A	±5%

=== Oregon ===
7 electoral votes
(Democrat in 1996)
(Democrat in 2000)

Poll Source	Date administered (2004)	John Kerry	George W. Bush	Margin	Sample size	Margin of error
MSNBC/Knight-Ridder/Mason-Dixon Polling & Research	October 27–29	50%	44%	6	625 LV	±4%
KATU-TV Portland/SurveyUSA	October 25–27	50%	47%	3	687 LV	±3.8%
The Oregonian/KATU-TV/Davis, Hibbitts, & Midghall	October 25–27	49%	43%	6	608 LV	±3.8%
American Research Group	October 25–27	50%	46%	4	600 LV	±4%
Rasmussen Reports/Pulse Opinion Research	October 6–19	52%	45%	7	500 LV	±4.5%
Mason-Dixon Polling & Research	October 15–18	47%	46%	1	625 LV	±4%
CNN/USA Today/Gallup	October 15–18	53%	45%	8	700 LV	±4%
American Research Group	October 9–12	50%	44%	6	600 LV	±4%
KATU-TV Portland/SurveyUSA	October 9–11	53%	44%	9	628 LV	±4%
The Oregonian/KATU-TV/Davis, Hibbitts, & Midghall	September 24–27	47%	45%	2	624 RV	±4%
Rasmussen Reports/Pulse Opinion Research	September 14–27	49%	45%	4	Not reported	±5%
KATU-TV Portland/SurveyUSA	September 19–21	47%	48%	1	747 LV	±3.7%
Zogby International	September 2	53%	43%	10	430 LV	±4.8%
Rasmussen Reports/Pulse Opinion Research	July 1–31	47%	41%	6	Not reported	±5%
American Research Group	July 19–22	50%	43%	7	600 LV	±4%
Rasmussen Reports/Pulse Opinion Research	June 1–30	50%	42%	8	Not reported	±5%
National Republican Committee/Public Opinion Strategies (R)	June 1–6	45.8%	42.3%	3.5	800 LV	±3.46%
Rasmussen Reports/Pulse Opinion Research	May 1–31	45%	46%	1	Not reported	±5%
KGW-TV Northwest News Channel 8/Riley Research Associates	May 5–10	39%	44%	5	776 LV	±3.5%
American Research Group	May 3–5	48%	46%	2	600 LV	±4%
Rasmussen Reports/Pulse Opinion Research	April 25	46%	45%	1	500 LV	±4.5%

Three-way race

Poll Source	Date administered (2004)	John Kerry	George W. Bush	Ralph Nader	Margin	Sample size	Margin of error
Wall Street Journal/Zogby Interactive	October 25–30	53.9%	43.8%	0.5%	10.1	1,125 LV	±3.0%
Wall Street Journal/Zogby Interactive	October 13–18	55.7%	42.6%	0.3%	13.1	890 LV	±3.3%
Riley Research Associates	October 9–13	43%	48%	1%	5	400 LV	±4.9%
American Research Group	October 9–12	49%	44%	2%	5	600 LV	±4%
Wall Street Journal/Zogby Interactive	September 30–October 5	53.8%	43.7%	1.2%	10.1	925 LV	±3.2%
Wall Street Journal/Zogby Interactive	September 13–17	53.9%	41.9%	1.7%	12	809 LV	±3.5%
MSNBC/Knight-Ridder/Mason-Dixon Polling & Research	September 14–16	43%	47%	1%	4	625 LV	±4%
American Research Group	September 10–13	47%	45%	2%	2	600 LV	±4%
Wall Street Journal/Zogby Interactive	August 30–September 3	52.8%	43.1%	1.6%	9.7	787 LV	±3.5%
The Oregonian/Riley Research Associates	August 26–September 1	45%	46%	1%	1	507 LV	±4.4%
Wall Street Journal/Zogby Interactive	August 16–21	53.9%	42.6%	1.5%	11.3	708 LV	±3.7%
Wall Street Journal/Zogby Interactive	July 26–30	49.9%	45.9%	2%	4	644 LV	±3.9%
Wall Street Journal/Zogby Interactive	July 19–23	52%	42.8%	1.1%	9.2	637 LV	±3.9%
American Research Group	July 19–22	50%	42%	4%	8	600 LV	±4%
Wall Street Journal/Zogby Interactive	July 6–10	51.6%	42.4%	2.3%	9.2	575 LV	±4.1%
Wall Street Journal/Zogby Interactive	June 15–20	50.9%	44.3%	1.2%	6.6	638 LV	±3.9%
Wall Street Journal/Zogby Interactive	June 1–6	50.5%	44.6%	1%	5.9	666 LV	±3.8%
Moore Information	May 31–June 1	44%	39%	4%	5	500 RV	±4%
Wall Street Journal/Zogby Interactive	May 18–23	49.7%	44.3%	2.9%	5.4	933 LV	±3.2%
American Research Group	May 3–5	45%	45%	5%	Tied	600 LV	±4%
Rasmussen Reports/Pulse Opinion Research	April 25	43%	43%	8%	Tied	500 LV	±4.5%
The Oregonian/Davis, Hibbitts, & Midghall	March 4	45%	40%	5%	5	400 RV	±5%

=== Pennsylvania ===
21 electoral votes
(Democrat in 1996)
(Democrat in 2000)

Poll Source	Date administered (2004)	John Kerry	George W. Bush	Margin	Sample size	Margin of error
KDKA-TV Pittsburgh/WCAU-TV Philadelphia/WNEP-TV Wilkes-Barre/SurveyUSA	October 31–November 1	49%	48%	1	657 LV	±3.9%
Reuters/Zogby International (Daily Tracking)	October 29–November 1	50%	46%	4	601 LV	±4.1%
KDKA-TV Pittsburgh/WCAU-TV Philadelphia/WNEP-TV Wilkes-Barre/SurveyUSA	October 29–31	51%	47%	4	766 LV	±3.6%
CNN/USA Today/Gallup	October 28–31	46%	50%	4	1,082 LV	±3%
Quinnipiac University	October 27–31	47%	47%	Tied	1,022 LV	±3.1%
Rasmussen Reports/Pulse Opinion Research (Daily Tracking)	October 25–31	49%	47%	2	600 LV	±4%
MSNBC/Knight-Ridder/Mason-Dixon Polling & Research	October 27–29	48%	46%	2	625 LV	±4%
Reuters/Zogby International (Daily Tracking)	October 25–28	47%	47%	Tied	603 LV	±4.1%
WHYY/West Chester University	October 23–27	49.9%	44.6%	5.3	684 LV	±3.7%
Philadelphia Inquirer/Temple University	October 22–27	48%	47%	1	1,488 LV	±3%
CNN/USA Today/Gallup	October 23–26	50%	47%	3	670 LV	±4%
Quinnipiac University	October 22–26	47%	49%	2	909 LV	±3.3%
Los Angeles Times	October 22–26	48%	48%	Tied	585 LV	±4%
KDKA-TV Pittsburgh/WCAU-TV Philadelphia/WNEP-TV Wilkes-Barre/SurveyUSA	October 23–25	53%	45%	8	803 LV	±3.5%
American Research Group	October 23–25	50%	47%	3	600 LV	±4%
Reuters/Zogby International (Daily Tracking)	October 21–24	47%	45%	2	603 LV	±4.1%
Franklin & Marshall College	October 19–23	51%	46%	5	Not reported	Not reported
Rasmussen Reports/Pulse Opinion Research (Daily Tracking)	October 17–23	49%	46%	3	424 LV	±4%
Morning Call/Muhlenberg College	October 17–22	48%	46%	2	787 RV	±3.5%
Quinnipiac University	October 16–20	51%	46%	5	841 LV	±3.4%
MSNBC/Knight-Ridder/Mason-Dixon Polling & Research	October 15–18	46%	45%	1	625 LV	±4%
KDKA-TV Pittsburgh/WCAU-TV Philadelphia/WNEP-TV Wilkes-Barre/SurveyUSA	October 15–17	51%	45%	6	619 LV	±4%
Rasmussen Reports/Pulse Opinion Research (Daily Tracking)	October 6–12	47%	46%	1	578 LV	±4%
Quinnipiac University	October 9–11	49%	47%	2	1,343 LV	±2.7%
American Research Group	October 4–6	49%	46%	3	600 LV	±4%
KDKA-TV Pittsburgh/WCAU-TV Philadelphia/WNEP-TV Wilkes-Barre/SurveyUSA	October 3–5	49%	47%	2	776 LV	±3.6%
WHYY/West Chester University	October 1–4	50.3%	43%	7.3	600 LV	±4%
Rasmussen Reports/Pulse Opinion Research (Daily Tracking)	September 25–October 1	47%	47%	Tied	578 LV	±4%
CNN/USA Today/Gallup	September 25–28	47%	50%	3	654 LV	±4%
Quinnipiac University	September 22–26	49%	46%	3	726 LV	±3.6%
Philadelphia Inquirer/Temple University	September 17–24	49%	47%	2	1,133 LV	±3%
Rasmussen Reports/Pulse Opinion Research (Daily Tracking)	September 17–23	46%	47%	1	Not reported	±4%
Rasmussen Reports/Pulse Opinion Research	September 10–16	48%	46%	2	Not reported	±4%
Franklin & Marshall College	September 8–15	49%	49%	Tied	Not reported	Not reported
Quinnipiac University	September 11–14	48%	49%	1	792 LV	±3.5%
ABC News	September 9–12	48%	49%	1	Not reported	±3.5%
Rasmussen Reports/Pulse Opinion Research	September 6–12	48%	49%	1	526 LV	±4%
KDKA-TV Pittsburgh/WCAU-TV Philadelphia/WNEP-TV Wilkes-Barre/SurveyUSA	September 7–9	49%	47%	2	697 LV	±3.8%
CNN/USA Today/Gallup	September 4–7	47%	48%	1	718 LV	±4%
CNN/USA Today/Gallup	August 23–26	47%	48%	1	729 LV	±5%
Rasmussen Reports/Pulse Opinion Research	August 1–26	49%	45%	4	Not reported	±4%
Quinnipiac University	August 11–16	48%	43%	5	1,430 RV	±2.6%
KDKA-TV Pittsburgh/WCAU-TV Philadelphia/WNEP-TV Wilkes-Barre/SurveyUSA	July 30–August 2	53%	41%	12	748 LV	±3.7%
Rasmussen Reports/Pulse Opinion Research	July 1–31	46%	45%	1	Not reported	±4%
Los Angeles Times	July 19–21	51%	39%	12	815 RV	±4%
Quinnipiac University	July 6–11	49%	42%	7	1,577 RV	±2.5%
Rasmussen Reports/Pulse Opinion Research	June 1–30	48%	43%	5	Not reported	±4%
Fox News/Opinion Dynamics Corporation	June 22–23	44%	47%	3	700 RV	±4%
Rasmussen Reports/Pulse Opinion Research	June 17–23	48%	43%	5	Not reported	±4%
Quinnipiac University	June 21–22	49%	43%	6	839 RV	±3.4%
KDKA-TV Pittsburgh/WCAU-TV Philadelphia/WNEP-TV Wilkes-Barre/SurveyUSA	July 7–9	47%	46%	1	684 LV	±3.8%
National Republican Committee/Public Opinion Strategies (R)	June 1–6	47.1%	45.6%	1.5	1,200 LV	±2.83%
Rasmussen Reports/Pulse Opinion Research	May 1–31	44%	45%	1	Not reported	±4%
Quinnipiac University	May 24–25	45%	42%	3	701 RV	±3.7%
Morning Call/Muhlenberg College	May 5–14	48%	43%	5	400 RV	±4.9%
Bennett, Petts & Associates (D)	May 2–3	49%	43%	6	600 LV	±4%
Quinnipiac University	April 13–19	42%	46%	4	769 RV	±3.5%
Rasmussen Reports/Pulse Opinion Research	March 14–16	46%	45%	1	500 LV	±4.5%
Quinnipiac University	March 9–15	45%	44%	1	1,022 RV	±3.1%
KDKA-TV Pittsburgh/WCAU-TV Philadelphia/WNEP-TV Wilkes-Barre/SurveyUSA	March 8–10	49%	47%	2	802 RV	±3.5%
Mansfield University	February 15–March 3	46.7%	44.9%	1.8	Not reported	Not reported
Franklin & Marshall College	February 19–22	47%	46%	1	532 RV	±4.2%
Quinnipiac University	February 10–16	50%	45%	5	1,356 RV	±2.7%
Quinnipiac University	December 11–14	42%	50%	8	1,092 RV	±3%
Quinnipiac University	October 9–13, 2003	43%	50%	7	1,116 RV	±2.9%
Quinnipiac University	July 30–August 4, 2003	37%	55%	18	1,037 RV	±3%

Three-way race

Poll Source	Date administered (2004)	John Kerry	George W. Bush	Ralph Nader	Margin	Sample size	Margin of error
Wall Street Journal/Zogby Interactive	October 13–18	51.8%	46.1%	0.4%	5.7	1,402 LV	±2.6%
American Research Group	October 4–6	48%	46%	1%	2	600 LV	±4%
Wall Street Journal/Zogby Interactive	September 30–October 5	51.8%	46.4%	0.2%	5.4	1,379 LV	±2.6%
Franklin & Marshall College	September 30–October 4	49%	43%	3%	6	Not reported	Not reported
Pittsburgh Post-Gazette/Mason-Dixon Polling & Research	September 27–28	45%	44%	2%	1	625 LV	±4%
CNN/USA Today/Gallup	September 25–28	46%	49%	1%	3	654 LV	±4%
Fox News/Opinion Dynamics Corporation	September 21–22	48%	45%	1%	3	800 LV	±3.5%
American Research Group	September 15–19	47%	46%	1%	1	600 LV	±4%
Wall Street Journal/Zogby Interactive	September 13–17	50.6%	47.5%	0.1%	3.1	1,185 LV	±2.9%
MSNBC/Knight-Ridder/Mason-Dixon Polling & Research	September 14–16	45%	44%	1%	1	624 LV	±4%
ABC News	September 9–12	46%	49%	2%	3	Not reported	±3.5%
Wall Street Journal/Zogby Interactive	August 30–September 3	49.5%	46.7%	1%	2.8	1,090 LV	±3.0%
CNN/USA Today/Gallup	August 23–26	47%	47%	2%	Tied	729 LV	±5%
IssuesPA/Pew Charitable Trusts/Princeton Survey Research International	August 13–21	44%	45%	3%	1	861 LV	±4%
Wall Street Journal/Zogby Interactive	August 16–21	52.3%	44%	1%	8.3	901 LV	±3.3%
Quinnipiac University	August 11–16	47%	42%	4%	5	1,430 RV	±2.6%
Franklin & Marshall College	August 2–15	48%	42%	3%	6	600 RV	±3.8%
Wall Street Journal/Zogby Interactive	July 26–30	52.7%	44.7%	0.7%	8	932 LV	±3.2%
Wall Street Journal/Zogby Interactive	July 19–23	51.8%	45.3%	0.9%	6.5	881 LV	±3.3%
Los Angeles Times	July 19–21	48%	38%	5%	10	815 RV	±4%
Quinnipiac University	July 6–11	46%	41%	5%	5	1,577 RV	±2.5%
Wall Street Journal/Zogby Interactive	July 6–10	52.2%	44.9%	0.9%	7.3	742 LV	±3.6%
Fox News/Opinion Dynamics Corporation	June 22–23	41%	46%	3%	5	750 RV	±4%
Quinnipiac University	June 21–22	44%	43%	7%	1	839 RV	±3.4%
Wall Street Journal/Zogby Interactive	June 15–20	51.7%	44.7%	1.5%	7	834 LV	±3.4%
Wall Street Journal/Zogby Interactive	June 1–6	51.5%	44.9%	0.7%	6.6	723 LV	±3.6%
Quinnipiac University	May 24–25	44%	41%	6%	3	701 RV	±3.7%
Wall Street Journal/Zogby Interactive	May 18–23	50.8%	42.6%	1.8%	8.2	655 LV	±3.8%
IssuesPA/Pew Charitable Trusts/Princeton Survey Research International	April 16–25	42%	42%	5%	Tied	867 RV	±4%
Quinnipiac University	April 13–19	39%	45%	8%	6	769 RV	±3.5%
Franklin & Marshall College	March 25–29	40%	46%	3%	6	565 RV	±4.1%
Quinnipiac University	March 9–15	40%	44%	7%	4	1,022 RV	±3.1%

=== Rhode Island ===
4 electoral votes
(Democrat in 1996)
(Democrat in 2000)

Poll Source	Date administered (2004)	John Kerry	George W. Bush	Margin	Sample size	Margin of error
WLNE-TV Providence/SurveyUSA	October 25–27	54%	31%	13	594 LV	±4.1%
WLNE-TV Providence/SurveyUSA	October 9–11	56%	36%	20	603 LV	±4.1%
WLNE-TV Providence/SurveyUSA	September 18–20	55%	37%	18	705 LV	±3.8%
Brown University	February 7–9	53%	31%	22	455 RV	±5%
Brown University	September 13–15, 2003	39%	36%	3	367 RV	±5%

Three-way race

Poll Source	Date administered (2004)	John Kerry	George W. Bush	Ralph Nader	Margin	Sample size	Margin of error
American Research Group	September 11–13	58%	30%	4%	28	600 LV	±4%
Brown University	June 12–14	49%	25%	5%	24	477 RV	±5%

=== South Carolina ===
8 electoral votes
(Republican in 1996)
(Republican in 2000)

Poll Source	Date administered (2004)	John Kerry	George W. Bush	Margin	Sample size	Margin of error
WCSC-TV Charleston/SurveyUSA	October 29–31	43%	54%	11	635 LV	±4%
Rasmussen Reports/Pulse Opinion Research	October 24–30	41%	55%	14	Not reported	±5%
WCSC-TV Charleston/SurveyUSA	October 22–24	39%	57%	18	564 LV	±4.2%
Post and Courier/Mason-Dixon Polling & Research	October 19–20	40%	53%	13	625 LV	±4%
WCSC-TV Charleston/SurveyUSA	October 10–12	42%	55%	13	563 LV	±4.2%
Rasmussen Reports/Pulse Opinion Research	September 30–October 6	42%	53%	11	Not reported	±5%
Post and Courier/Mason-Dixon Polling & Research	September 27–29	37%	55%	18	625 LV	±4%
DeMint for Senate/Basswood Research (R)	September 25–26	32%	59%	27	500 LV	±4.4%
Rasmussen Reports/Pulse Opinion Research	September 17–23	42%	51%	9	Not reported	±5%
WCSC-TV Charleston/SurveyUSA	September 19–21	38%	58%	20	684 LV	±3.8%
Rasmussen Reports/Pulse Opinion Research	September 10–16	44%	50%	6	Not reported	±5%
DeMint for Senate/Public Opinion Strategies (R)	September 8–9	42%	54%	12	600 LV	±4%
Tenenbaum for Senate/Global Strategy Group (D)	September 7–9	38%	54%	16	600 LV	±4.0%
Rasmussen Reports/Pulse Opinion Research	August 1–26	43%	52%	9	Not reported	±5%
WCSC-TV Charleston/SurveyUSA	August 16–18	42%	53%	11	727 LV	±3.7%
WCSC-TV Charleston/SurveyUSA	July 10–12	44%	51%	7	710 LV	Not reported
Rasmussen Reports/Pulse Opinion Research	June 1–30	36%	53%	17	Not reported	±5%
DeMint for Senate/Public Opinion Strategies (R)	June 28–29	40%	55%	15	600 LV	±4%
Rasmussen Reports/Pulse Opinion Research	May 1–31	39%	49%	10	Not reported	±5%

Three-way race

Poll Source	Date administered (2004)	John Kerry	George W. Bush	Ralph Nader	Margin	Sample size	Margin of error
American Research Group	September 14–16	40%	52%	1%	12	600 LV	±4%

=== South Dakota ===
3 electoral votes
(Republican in 1996)
(Republican in 2000)

Poll Source	Date administered (2004)	John Kerry	George W. Bush	Margin	Sample size	Margin of error
Rasmussen Reports/Pulse Opinion Research	October 25	42%	54%	12	500 LV	±4.5%
KELOLAND-TV/Argus Leader/Mason-Dixon Polling & Research	October 19–21	36%	55%	19	800 LV	±3.5%
Rasmussen Reports/Pulse Opinion Research	October 12	42%	52%	10	500 LV	±4.5%
Rasmussen Reports/Pulse Opinion Research	September 29	40%	52%	12	500 LV	±4.5%
	September 8	41%	54%	13	500 LV	±4.5%
KELOLAND-TV/Argus Leader/Mason-Dixon Polling & Research	February 5–7	39%	50%	11	800 RV	±3.5%

Three-way race

Poll Source	Date administered (2004)	John Kerry	George W. Bush	Ralph Nader	Margin	Sample size	Margin of error
National Republican Senatorial Committee/McLaughlin & Associates (R)	October 21, 24	32.5%	54.5%	1.5%	22	400 LV	±4.9%
Rapid City Journal/KOTA-TV Rapid City/KSFY-TV Sioux Falls/Mitchell Daily Republic/Watertown Public Opinion/Zogby International	September 24–28	29%	57%	2%	28	500 LV	±4.5%
KELOLAND-TV/Argus Leader/Mason-Dixon Polling & Research	September 20–22	37%	50%	2%	13	800 LV	±3.5%
American Research Group	September 8–12	39%	58%	1%	19	600 LV	±4%
KOTA-TV/Zogby International	May 19–21	34%	48%	6%	14	500 LV	±4%
KELOLAND-TV/Argus Leader/Mason-Dixon Polling & Research	May 10–14	35%	51%	4%	16	800 RV	±3.5%

=== Tennessee ===
11 electoral votes
(Democrat in 1996)
(Republican in 2000)

Poll Source	Date administered (2004)	John Kerry	George W. Bush	Margin	Sample size	Margin of error
WBIR-TV Knoxville/SurveyUSA	October 28–30	40%	58%	18	629 LV	±4%
University of Tennessee	October 7–20	37%	54%	17	656 RV	±3.8%
WBIR-TV Knoxville/SurveyUSA	October 17–19	38%	60%	22	615 LV	±4%
Middle Tennessee State University	October 4–15	39%	50%	11	624 A	±4%
WBIR-TV Knoxville/SurveyUSA	October 3–5	39%	58%	19	637 LV	±4%
Rasmussen Reports/Pulse Opinion Research	September 16–29	44%	52%	8	500 LV	±4.5%
WBIR-TV Knoxville/SurveyUSA	September 20–22	41%	55%	14	601 LV	±4.1%
WBIR-TV Knoxville/SurveyUSA	July 31–August 2	46%	48%	2	586 LV	±4.2%
WBIR-TV Knoxville/SurveyUSA	June 19–21	41%	51%	10	700 LV	±3.8%
Rasmussen Reports/Pulse Opinion Research	June 16	41%	49%	8	500 LV	±4.5%
National Republican Committee/Public Opinion Strategies (R)	June 1–6	41.6%	52.3%	10.7	800 LV	±3.46%
SurveyUSA	March 20–22	41%	52%	11	678 LV	±3.9%
Middle Tennessee State University	February 16–28	44%	48%	4	701 A	±4%
The Tennessean/Chattanooga Times Free Press/Mason-Dixon Polling & Research	January 28–29	43%	47%	4	400 RV	±5%

Three-way race

Poll Source	Date administered (2004)	John Kerry	George W. Bush	Ralph Nader	Margin	Sample size	Margin of error
Wall Street Journal/Zogby Interactive	October 25–30	47.1%	50.4%	0.4%	3.3	1,210 LV	±2.8%
The Tennessean/Chattanooga Times Free Press/Mason-Dixon Polling & Research	October 19–21	41%	53%	1%	12	625 LV	±4%
Wall Street Journal/Zogby Interactive	October 13–18	47.8%	50.3%	0.1%	2.5	992 LV	±3.1%
Wall Street Journal/Zogby Interactive	September 30–October 5	47.8%	48.7%	0%	0.9	983 LV	±3.1%
American Research Group	September 16–18	43%	50%	1%	7	600 LV	±4%
Wall Street Journal/Zogby Interactive	September 13–17	45.9%	51.4%	0.1%	5.5	943 LV	±3.2%
The Tennessean/Chattanooga Times Free Press/Mason-Dixon Polling & Research	September 11–14	37%	53%	1%	16	625 LV	±4%
Wall Street Journal/Zogby Interactive	August 30−September 3	43.6%	53.2%	0.4%	9.6	916 LV	±3.2%
Wall Street Journal/Zogby Interactive	August 16–21	49.6%	47.7%	0.3%	1.9	768 LV	±3.5%
Wall Street Journal/Zogby Interactive	July 26–30	49.3%	47.5%	0.6%	1.8	821 LV	±3.4%
Wall Street Journal/Zogby Interactive	July 19–23	49.1%	46.9%	0.6%	2.1	791 LV	±3.5%
Wall Street Journal/Zogby Interactive	July 6–10	47.5%	47.5%	0.9%	Tied	708 LV	±3.7%
Wall Street Journal/Zogby Interactive	June 15–20	38.6%	57.4%	0.8%	18.8	786 LV	±3.5%
Wall Street Journal/Zogby Interactive	June 1–6	42.6%	54.3%	1%	11.7	715 LV	±3.7%
Wall Street Journal/Zogby Interactive	May 18–23	46.8%	49.3%	0.6%	2.5	1,057 LV	±3.0%

=== Texas ===
34 electoral votes
(Republican in 1996)
(Republican in 2000)

Poll Source	Date administered (2004)	John Kerry	George W. Bush	Margin	Sample size	Margin of error
KPRC-TV Houston/KEYE-TV Austin/WOAI-TV San Antonio/SurveyUSA	October 26–28	37%	59%	22	602 LV	±4.1%
Scripps Howard	October 11–28	32%	58%	26	Not reported	Not reported
KPRC-TV Houston/KEYE-TV Austin/WOAI-TV San Antonio/SurveyUSA	October 9–11	37%	60%	23	598 LV	±4.1%
KPRC-TV Houston/KEYE-TV Austin/WOAI-TV San Antonio/SurveyUSA	September 19–21	37%	58%	21	642 LV	±3.9%
Scripps Howard	August 9–26	33%	57%	24	Not reported	Not reported
Rasmussen Reports/Pulse Opinion Research	August 1–26	38%	57%	19	Not reported	±3%
KPRC-TV Houston/KEYE-TV Austin/WOAI-TV San Antonio/SurveyUSA	August 20–22	37%	58%	21	705 LV	±3.7%
Rasmussen Reports/Pulse Opinion Research	June 1–30	37%	55%	18	Not reported	±3%
Rasmussen Reports/Pulse Opinion Research	May 1–31	38%	55%	17	Not reported	±3%
Scripps Howard	May 3–15	29%	58%	29	1,000 A	±3%

Three-way race

Poll Source	Date administered (2004)	John Kerry	George W. Bush	Ralph Nader	Margin	Sample size	Margin of error
American Research Group	September 16–20	36%	58%	1%	22	600 LV	±4%

=== Utah ===
5 electoral votes
(Republican in 1996)
(Republican in 2000)

Poll Source	Date administered (2004)	John Kerry	George W. Bush	Margin	Sample size	Margin of error
Deseret Morning News/KSL-TV/Dan Jones & Associates	February 19	31%	64%	33	404 A	±5.0%

Three-way race

Poll Source	Date administered (2004)	John Kerry	George W. Bush	Ralph Nader	Margin	Sample size	Margin of error
Deseret Morning News/KSL-TV/Dan Jones & Associates	October 21–28	24%	69%	1%	45	1,228 RV	±2.8%
Salt Lake Tribune/KUTV 2 News/Valley Research	October 21–26	23.3%	68.3%	2.3%	45	1,200 RV	±2.8%
American Research Group	September 10–13	27%	64%	4%	37	600 LV	±4%
Deseret Morning News/KSL-TV/Dan Jones & Associates	September 6–9	25%	65%	2%	40	915 RV	±3.3%
Deseret Morning News/KSL-TV/Dan Jones & Associates	May 10–13	22%	67%	3%	45	923 A	±3.2%

=== Vermont ===
3 electoral votes
(Democrat in 1996)
(Democrat in 2000)

Poll Source	Date administered (2004)	John Kerry	George W. Bush	Ralph Nader	Margin	Sample size	Margin of error
American Research Group	September 9–12	50%	40%	4%	10	600 LV	±4%

=== Virginia ===
13 electoral votes
(Republican in 1996)
(Republican in 2000)

Poll Source	Date administered (2004)	John Kerry	George W. Bush	Margin	Sample size	Margin of error
WSLS-TV Roanoke/SurveyUSA	October 27–29	47%	51%	4	606 LV	±4.1%
NBC12 News/Richmond-Times Dispatch	October 20–26	40%	49%	9	751 LV	±4%
The Daily Press/Mason-Dixon Polling & Research	October 22–25	44%	50%	6	625 LV	±4%
WSLS-TV Roanoke/SurveyUSA	October 16–18	46%	50%	4	664 LV	±3.9%
Zogby International	September 30–October 6	47%	50%	3	Not reported	Not reported
The Daily Press/Mason-Dixon Polling & Research	September 24–27	43%	49%	6	625 LV	±4%
Rasmussen Reports/Pulse Opinion Research	September 24–27	44%	50%	6	400 LV	±5%
WSLS-TV Roanoke/SurveyUSA	September 21–23	42%	53%	11	744 LV	±3.7%
American Research Group	September 12–14	43%	49%	6	600 LV	±4%
Zogby International	August 29	48%	49%	1	Not reported	Not reported
Rasmussen Reports/Pulse Opinion Research	August 1–26	45%	50%	5	Not reported	±5%
WSLS-TV Roanoke/SurveyUSA	August 20–22	45%	49%	4	730 LV	±3.7%
Rasmussen Reports/Pulse Opinion Research	July 1–31	46%	49%	3	Not reported	±5%
WSLS-TV Roanoke/SurveyUSA	July 6–8	45%	50%	5	686 LV	±3.8%
Rasmussen Reports/Pulse Opinion Research	June 1–30	45%	48%	3	Not reported	±5%
National Republican Committee/Public Opinion Strategies (R)	June 1–6	41.9%	50.3%	8.4	800 LV	±3.46%
Rasmussen Reports/Pulse Opinion Research	May 1–31	45%	47%	2	Not reported	±5%

Three-way race

Poll Source	Date administered (2004)	John Kerry	George W. Bush	Ralph Nader	Margin	Sample size	Margin of error
Zogby International	September 13–17	47%	50%	3%	3	Not reported	Not reported

=== Washington ===
11 electoral votes
(Democrat in 1996)
(Democrat in 2000)

Poll Source	Date administered (2004)	John Kerry	George W. Bush	Margin	Sample size	Margin of error
KING-TV Seattle/KHQ-TV Spokane/SurveyUSA	October 29–31	51%	47%	4	622 LV	±4%
Seattle Post-Intelligencer/KOMO-TV/Mason-Dixon Polling & Research	October 25–26	50%	45%	5	800 LV	±3.5%
KING-TV Seattle/KHQ-TV Spokane/SurveyUSA	October 23–25	51%	45%	6	618 LV	±4%
Rasmussen Reports/Pulse Opinion Research	October 6–19	52%	44%	8	400 LV	±5%
KING-TV Seattle/KHQ-TV Spokane/SurveyUSA	October 15–17	52%	45%	7	634 LV	±4%
Elway Research	October 14–16	50%	44%	6	Not reported	Not reported
KING-TV Seattle/KHQ-TV Spokane/SurveyUSA	October 2–4	54%	43%	11	640 LV	±4%
Rasmussen Reports/Pulse Opinion Research	September 10–23	50%	43%	7	400 LV	±5%
KING-TV Seattle/KHQ-TV Spokane/SurveyUSA	September 19–21	51%	46%	5	627 LV	±4%
Elway Research	September 17–19	52%	38%	14	405 RV	±5%
Rasmussen Reports/Pulse Opinion Research	August 1–26	49%	42%	7	Not reported	±5%
Rasmussen Reports/Pulse Opinion Research	July 1–31	50%	44%	6	Not reported	±5%
Rasmussen Reports/Pulse Opinion Research	June 1–30	50%	41%	9	Not reported	±5%
National Republican Committee/Public Opinion Strategies (R)	June 1–6	49.4%	42.9%	6.5	800 LV	±3.46%
Murray for Senate/Fairbank, Maslin, Maullin & Associates (D)	April 22–27	46%	42%	4	800 RV	±3.8%
Moore Information	April 18–19	45%	41%	4	500 RV	±5%
Elway Research	April 2–5	46%	41%	5	405 RV	±5%
Rasmussen Reports/Pulse Opinion Research	March 25	50%	44%	6	500 LV	±4.5%
KING-TV Seattle/KHQ-TV Spokane/SurveyUSA	March 21–23	47%	43%	4	698 LV	±3.8%
KING-TV Seattle/KHQ-TV Spokane/SurveyUSA	February 3–4	55%	43%	12	975 RV	±3.2%

Three-way race

Poll Source	Date administered (2004)	John Kerry	George W. Bush	Ralph Nader	Margin	Sample size	Margin of error
Wall Street Journal/Zogby Interactive	October 25–30	54.6%	43.4%	0.3%	11.2	1,832 LV	±2.3%
Wall Street Journal/Zogby Interactive	October 13–18	54.3%	43.9%	0.4%	10.4	1,440 LV	±2.6%
Wall Street Journal/Zogby Interactive	September 30–October 5	53.7%	43.8%	0.7%	9.9	1,418 LV	±2.6%
The Columbian/Ipsos	September 17–20	51%	42%	2%	9	406 RV	±4.9%
American Research Group	September 9–13	51%	44%	2%	7	600 LV	±4%
CNN/USA Today/Gallup	September 3–6	52%	44%	1%	8%	646 LV	±5%
Wall Street Journal/Zogby Interactive	August 30–September 3	52.7%	44.2%	0.5%	8.5	1,265 LV	±2.8%
Wall Street Journal/Zogby Interactive	August 16–21	53.1%	44.7%	0.6%	8.4	1,038 LV	±3.0%
KING-TV Seattle/KHQ-TV Spokane/SurveyUSA	August 15–17	51%	43%	2%	8	602 LV	±4.1%
Moore Information	August 14–15	50%	44%	4%	6	600 RV	±4%
KING-TV Seattle/KHQ-TV Spokane/SurveyUSA	July 31–August 2	51%	43%	3%	8	585 LV	±4.2%
Wall Street Journal/Zogby Interactive	July 26–30	52.6%	44.8%	1.2%	7.8	1,162 LV	±2.9%
Wall Street Journal/Zogby Interactive	July 19–23	52%	44.4%	1.5%	7.6	1,155 LV	±2.9%
Wall Street Journal/Zogby Interactive	July 6–10	52.6%	44.4%	0.8%	8.2	1,073 LV	±3.0%
Murray for Senate/Fairbank, Maslin, Maullin & Associates (D)	June 24–28	49%	41%	4%	8	800 RV	±3.8%
Moore Information	June 23–24	43%	43%	4%	Tied	500 RV	±4%
Wall Street Journal/Zogby Interactive	June 15–20	51.6%	45.2%	1%	6.4	1,246 LV	±2.8%
Moore Information	June 9–11	45%	44%	4%	1	500 RV	±4%
Mason-Dixon Polling & Research	June 9–11	46%	42%	2%	4	625 RV	±4%
Wall Street Journal/Zogby Interactive	June 1–6	51.7%	44.3%	1.9%	7.4	1,767 LV	±2.3%
KING-TV Seattle/KHQ-TV Spokane/SurveyUSA	June 1–3	49%	44%	3%	5	654 LV	±3.9%
Wall Street Journal/Zogby Interactive	May 18–23	52.5%	44.4%	1.3%	8.1	527 LV	±4.3%

=== West Virginia ===
5 electoral votes
(Democrat in 1996)
(Republican in 2000)

Poll Source	Date administered (2004)	John Kerry	George W. Bush	Margin	Sample size	Margin of error
MSNBC/Knight-Ridder/Mason-Dixon Polling & Research	October 27–29	43%	51%	8	625 LV	±4%
MSNBC/Knight-Ridder/Mason-Dixon Polling & Research	October 15–18	44%	49%	5	625 LV	±4%
CNN/USA Today/Gallup	September 17–20	45%	51%	6	619 LV	±5%
American Research Group	July 26–28	48%	44%	4	600 LV	±4%
American Research Group	June 15–17	48%	45%	3	600 LV	±4%
National Republican Committee/Public Opinion Strategies (R)	June 1–6	44.2%	47.1%	2.9	800 LV	±3.46%
Rasmussen Reports/Pulse Opinion Research	April 15	41%	46%	5	500 LV	±4.5%
American Research Group	March 23–24	46%	47%	1	600 LV	±4%

Three-way race

Poll Source	Date administered (2004)	John Kerry	George W. Bush	Ralph Nader	Margin	Sample size	Margin of error
Wall Street Journal/Zogby Interactive	October 25–30	45.6%	50.1%	0.2%	4.5	584 LV	±4.1%
Wall Street Journal/Zogby Interactive	October 13–18	45.8%	48.6%	0.7%	2.8	501 LV	±4.4%
Manchin for Governor/Global Strategy Group (D)	October 12–14	45%	47%	2%	2	600 LV	±4%
Wall Street Journal/Zogby Interactive	September 30–October 5	44%	50.1%	0.7%	6.1	501 LV	±4.4%
CNN/USA Today/Gallup	September 17–20	45%	51%	0%	6	619 LV	±5%
Wall Street Journal/Zogby Interactive	September 13–17	38.8%	51.2%	1.1%	12.4	528 LV	±4.3%
American Research Group	September 14–16	46%	46%	2%	Tied	600 LV	±4%
MSNBC/Knight-Ridder/Mason-Dixon Polling & Research	September 13–14	44%	45%	0%	1	625 LV	±4%
Wall Street Journal/Zogby Interactive	August 30–September 3	40.1%	49.1%	2.1%	9	532 LV	±4.3%
Wall Street Journal/Zogby Interactive	August 16–21	41.5%	49.3%	1.8%	7.8	504 LV	±4.4%
Wall Street Journal/Zogby Interactive	July 26–30	47.6%	44.2%	2.1%	3.4	517 LV	±4.3%
American Research Group	July 26–28	47%	44%	3%	3	600 LV	±4%
Wall Street Journal/Zogby Interactive	July 19–23	44%	47.9%	2.1%	3.9	512 LV	±4.3%
Wall Street Journal/Zogby Interactive	July 6–10	42.8%	51%	0.5%	8.2	518 LV	±4.3%
Wall Street Journal/Zogby Interactive	June 15–20	43.1%	49.1%	1.4%	6	467 LV	±4.5%
American Research Group	June 15–17	47%	44%	3%	3	600 LV	±4%
Wall Street Journal/Zogby Interactive	June 1–6	46.6%	43.5%	2.4%	3.1	490 LV	±4.4%
Wall Street Journal/Zogby Interactive	May 18–23	45.9%	48.3%	2%	2.4	504 LV	±4.4%
Associated Press/Ipsos	April 26–29	45%	49%	3%	4	984 RV	±3.1%
American Research Group	March 23–24	46%	46%	2%	Tied	600 LV	±4%

Four-way race

Poll Source	Date administered (2004)	John Kerry	George W. Bush	Ralph Nader	Michael Badnarik	Margin	Sample size	Margin of error
Rasmussen Reports/Pulse Opinion Research	September 16	44%	50%	1%	1%	6	500 LV	±4.5%

=== Wisconsin ===
10 electoral votes
(Democrat in 1996)
(Democrat in 2000)

Poll Source	Date administered (2004)	John Kerry	George W. Bush	Margin	Sample size	Margin of error
Reuters/Zogby International (Daily Tracking)	October 29–November 1	51%	45%	6	601 LV	±4.1%
MSNBC/Knight-Ridder/Mason-Dixon Polling & Research	October 27–29	48%	46%	2	625 LV	±4%
Rasmussen Reports/Pulse Opinion Research	October 16–29	48%	46%	2	Not reported	±5%
Reuters/Zogby International (Daily Tracking)	October 25–28	49%	46%	3	601 LV	±4.1%
American Research Group	October 25–27	48%	47%	1	600 LV	±4%
Reuters/Zogby International (Daily Tracking)	October 21–24	45%	48%	3	601 LV	±4.1%
American Research Group	October 16–19	47%	47%	Tied	600 LV	±4%
CNN/USA Today/Gallup	October 16–19	45%	51%	6	678 LV	±4%
CNN/USA Today/Gallup	October 3–5	46%	49%	3	704 LV	±4%
Rasmussen Reports/Pulse Opinion Research	September 14–27	46%	49%	3	400 LV	±5%
ABC News	September 16–19	44%	54%	10	Not reported	±3.5%
CNN/USA Today/Gallup	September 9–12	44%	52%	8	631 LV	±5%
Rasmussen Reports/Pulse Opinion Research	September 1–12	49%	47%	2	400 LV	±5%
CNN/USA Today/Gallup	August 23–26	47%	50%	3	645 LV	±5%
Rasmussen Reports/Pulse Opinion Research	August 1–26	48%	45%	3	Not reported	±5%
Los Angeles Times	August 21–24	44%	48%	4	512 LV	Not reported
American Research Group	July 13–15	49%	44%	5	600 LV	±4%
Hubert Humphrey Institute/University of Connecticut	June 21–July 12	45.9%	48.4%	2.5	575 RV	±4%
Los Angeles Times	June 5–8	44%	44%	Tied	694 RV	±4%
National Republican Committee/Public Opinion Strategies (R)	June 1–6	47.2%	44.6%	2.6	800 LV	±3.46%
Rasmussen Reports/Pulse Opinion Research	April 25	50%	42%	8	500 LV	±4.5%
University of Wisconsin (Badger Poll)	March 23–31	45%	49%	4	500 A	±4%

Three-way race

Poll Source	Date administered (2004)	John Kerry	George W. Bush	Ralph Nader	Margin	Sample size	Margin of error
Fox News/Opinion Dynamics Corporation	October 30–31	45%	48%	1%	3	700 LV	±3.7%
CNN/USA Today/Gallup	October 27–30	44%	52%	1%	8	1,119 LV	±3%
American Research Group	October 25–27	48%	47%	1%	1	600 LV	±4%
University of Wisconsin (Badger Poll)	October 23–27	45%	48%	3%	3	545 LV	±4.1%
American Research Group	October 16–19	47%	47%	2%	Tied	600 LV	±4%
CNN/USA Today/Gallup	October 16–19	44%	50%	3%	6	678 LV	±4%
Humphrey Institute/University of Connecticut	October 14–19	47%	48%	2%	1	623 LV	±4%
MSNBC/Knight-Ridder/Mason-Dixon Polling & Research	October 15–18	45%	45%	1%	Tied	625 LV	±4%
Wall Street Journal/Zogby Interactive	October 13–18	51.3%	47.5%	0.2%	3.8	883 LV	±3.3%
Wisconsin Public Radio/St. Norbert College	October 4–13	48%	43%	2%	5	401 LV	±5%
Chicago Tribune/Market Shares Corp.	October 8–11	47%	43%	2%	4	500 LV	±4.4%
CNN/USA Today/Gallup	October 3–5	46%	49%	2%	3	704 LV	±4%
America Coming Together/Lake, Snell, Perry & Associates (D)	October 3–5	48%	44%	1%	4	600 LV	Not reported
Wall Street Journal/Zogby Interactive	September 30–October 5	50.6%	48.1%	0.1%	2.5	844 LV	±3.4%
Wisconsin Policy Research Institute/Harris Interactive	September 22–26	40%	50%	6%	10	562 LV	±4%
University of Wisconsin (Badger Poll)	September 15–21	38%	52%	4%	14	Not reported	Not reported
ABC News	September 16–19	43%	53%	1%	10	Not reported	±3.5%
Wall Street Journal/Zogby Interactive	September 13–17	50.3%	47.9%	0.3%	2.4	771 LV	±3.5%
MSNBC/Knight-Ridder/Mason-Dixon Polling & Research	September 14–16	44%	46%	1%	2	625 LV	±4%
American Research Group	September 12–15	46%	46%	1%	Tied	600 LV	±4%
CNN/USA Today/Gallup	September 9–12	44%	52%	1%	8	631 LV	±5%
Wall Street Journal/Zogby Interactive	August 30–September 3	49.9%	47.5%	0.1%	2.4	732 LV	±3.6%
CNN/USA Today/Gallup	August 23–26	45%	48%	4%	3	645 LV	±5%
Los Angeles Times	August 21–24	44%	45%	3%	1	512 LV	Not reported
Wall Street Journal/Zogby Interactive	August 16–21	50.8%	46.4%	0.3%	4.4	638 LV	±3.9%
Wall Street Journal/Zogby Interactive	July 26–30	49.7%	47.8%	0.2%	1.9	634 LV	±3.9%
Wall Street Journal/Zogby Interactive	July 19–23	50.3%	46%	0.7%	4.3	601 LV	±4.0%
American Research Group	July 13–15	48%	42%	4%	6	600 LV	±4%
Wall Street Journal/Zogby Interactive	July 6–10	53.3%	43.9%	0.7%	9.4	551 LV	±4.2%
University of Wisconsin (Badger Poll)	June 15–23	42%	46%	5%	4	504 A	±4%
Wall Street Journal/Zogby Interactive	June 15–20	50.6%	46.2%	0.7%	4.4	602 LV	±4.0%
Los Angeles Times	June 5–8	42%	44%	4%	2	694 RV	±4%
Wall Street Journal/Zogby Interactive	June 1–6	50.4%	44.5%	1.3%	5.9	646 LV	±3.9%
Wall Street Journal/Zogby Interactive	May 18–23	51.9%	43.7%	1.4%	8.2	841 LV	±3.4%
America Coming Together/Lake, Snell, Perry & Associates (D)	April 26–28	49%	40%	2%	9	Not reported	Not reported
Journal Sentinel/Capital Times/University of Wisconsin (Badger Poll)	April 20–28	38%	50%	6%	12	511 A	±4%
Rasmussen Reports/Pulse Opinion Research	April 25	45%	41%	8%	4	500 LV	±4.5%
Wisconsin Public Radio/St. Norbert College	April 14–21	49%	42%	7%	7	385 RV	±5%
University of Wisconsin (Badger Poll)	March 23–31	41%	47%	5%	6	500 A	±4%
American Research Group	March 23–25	46%	43%	4%	3	600 LV	±4%

Four-way race

Poll Source	Date administered (2004)	John Kerry	George W. Bush	Ralph Nader	Michael Badnarik	Margin	Sample size	Margin of error
Badnarik for President/Rasmussen Reports/Pulse Opinion Research (L)	October 14	48%	47%	1%	1%	1	500 LV	±4.5%
Hubert Humphrey Institute/University of Connecticut	June 21–July 12	44.6%	46.1%	4%	1.5%	1.5	575 RV	±4%

=== Wyoming ===
3 electoral votes
(Republican in 1996)
(Republican in 2000)

Poll Source	Date administered (2004)	John Kerry	George W. Bush	Ralph Nader	Margin	Sample size	Margin of error
American Research Group	September 9–11	29%	65%	2%	36	600 LV	±4%
