= List of television stations in South Dakota =

This is a list of broadcast television stations that are licensed in the U.S. state of South Dakota.

== Full-power ==
- Stations are arranged by media market served and channel position.

Full-power television stations in South Dakota
Media market	Station	Channel	Primary affiliation(s)	Notes	Refs
Huron–Mitchell	KDLO-TV	3	CBS, MyNetworkTV on 3.2, The CW on 3.3	(Note: Licensed to Florence, South Dakota.) (Note: Satellite of KELO-TV.)	
Huron–Mitchell	KDLV-TV	5	NBC, Fox on 5.2, ABC on 13.1, The CW on 13.2	(Note: Satellite of KDLT-TV and KSFY-TV.)	
Huron–Mitchell	KQSD-TV	11	PBS	(Note: Licensed to Lowry, South Dakota.) (Note: Satellite of KUSD-TV.)	
Huron–Mitchell	KTTM	12	TCT	(Note: Satellite of KTTW.)	
Huron–Mitchell	KDSD-TV	16	PBS	(Note: Licensed to Aberdeen, South Dakota.)	
Pierre	KPRY-TV	4	ABC, The CW on 4.2, NBC on 5.1	(Note: Satellite of KSFY-TV.)	
Pierre	KPLO-TV	6	CBS	(Note: Licensed to Reliance, South Dakota.)	
Pierre	KTSD-TV	10	PBS		
Rapid City	KOTA-TV	3	ABC, Fox on 7.1		
Rapid City	KZSD-TV	8	PBS	(Note: Licensed to Martin, South Dakota.)	
Rapid City	KBHE-TV	9	PBS		
Rapid City	KQME	10	MeTV	(Note: Licensed to Lead, South Dakota.) (Note: Satellite of KHME.)	
Rapid City	KHSD-TV	11	ABC, Fox on 7.1	(Note: Satellite of KOTA-TV.)	
Rapid City	KPSD-TV	13	PBS	(Note: Licensed to Eagle Butte, South Dakota.)	
Rapid City	KCLO-TV	15	The CW, MyNetworkTV on 15.2		
Rapid City	KNBN	21	NBC, CBS on 21.2		
Rapid City	KHME	23	MeTV		
Sioux Falls	KUSD-TV	2	PBS	(Note: Licensed to Vermillion, South Dakota.)	
Sioux Falls	KTTW	7	TCT		
Sioux Falls	KESD-TV	8	PBS	(Note: Licensed to Brookings, South Dakota.)	
Sioux Falls	KELO-TV	11	CBS, MyNetworkTV on 11.2, The CW on 11.2		
Sioux Falls	KSFY-TV	13	ABC, The CW on 13.2		
Sioux Falls	KCSD-TV	23	PBS		
Sioux Falls	KSFL-TV	36	Ion Television		
Sioux Falls	KDLT-TV	46	NBC, Fox on 46.2		

== Low-power ==
Low-power television stations in South Dakota
Media market	Station	Channel	Primary affiliation(s)	Notes	Refs
Huron–Mitchell	K17KW-D	17	EWTN	(Note: Licensed to Gettysburg, South Dakota.)	
Pierre	K32FW-D	32	Purple TV		
Pierre	K34GM-D	34	3ABN		
Rapid City	KEVN-LD	7	Fox, ABC on 3.1		
Rapid City	KRPC-LP	33	Various		
Sioux Falls	K06QJ-D	6	[Blank]		
Sioux Falls	K22KD-D	22	[Blank]		
Sioux Falls	KAUN-LD	25	YTA TV		
Sioux Falls	KCPO-LD	26	Independent		
Sioux Falls	KSXF-LD	56	Various		

== Translators ==
Television station translators in South Dakota
Media market	Station	Channel	Translating	Notes	Refs
Huron–Mitchell	K24DT-D	3	KDLO-TV		
Huron–Mitchell	K33MI-D	5	KDLV-TV		
Huron–Mitchell	K32DK-D	7	KSFY-TV	(Note: Licensed to Watertown, South Dakota.)	
Huron–Mitchell	K36NW-D	13	KSFY-TV		
Huron–Mitchell	K28OE-D	46	KDLV-TV		
Pierre	K27HJ-D	5	KDLV-TV		
Pierre	KPLO-TV (DRT)	6	KPLO-TV		
Pierre	K14IO-D	14	KSFY-TV		
Rapid City	K15MY-D	3.1; 7.1	KOTA-TV; KEVN-LD	(Note: Licensed to Caputa, South Dakota.)	
Rapid City	K22OV-D	3.1; 7.1	KOTA-TV; KEVN-LD		
Rapid City	K29OF-D	7.1; 11.1	KEVN-LD; KHSD	(Note: Licensed to Deadwood, South Dakota.)	
Rapid City	K31QA-D	7.1; 11.1	KEVN-LD; KHSD		
Rapid City	K04GW-D	13	KPSD	(Note: Licensed to Spearfish, South Dakota.)	
Rapid City	K19GC-D	13	KPSD	(Note: Licensed to Belle Fourche, South Dakota.)	
Rapid City	K35MW-D	21	KNBN		
Rapid City	KQME	23	KHME		
Rapid City	KKRA-LD	25	KNBN		
Rapid City	KWBH-LD	27	KNBN		
Sioux Falls	K35GR-D	5	KDLV-TV	(Note: Licensed to Badger, South Dakota.)	
Sioux Falls	K17NF-D	5	KDLV-TV		
Sioux Falls	K25OU-D	13	KSFY-TV		
Sioux Falls	KABY-LD	15	KSFY-TV		
Sioux Falls	KCWS-LD	27	KSFL-TV		
~Sioux City, IA	K08PM-D	2	KUSD	(Note: Licensed to Wagner, South Dakota.)	
~Scottsbluff, NE	K10PS-D	8	KZSD	(Note: Licensed to Pine Ridge, South Dakota.)	
~Scottsbluff, NE	K15IZ-D	9	KBHE	(Note: Licensed to Edgemont, South Dakota.)	
~Scottsbluff, NE	K36NX-D	9	KBHE-TV	(Note: Licensed to Pringle, South Dakota.)	

== Defunct ==
- KDSJ-TV Lead (1960–1976)
- KRSD-TV Rapid City (1958–1976)
- KABY-TV Aberdeen (1958–2018)
