= List of The WB affiliates =

This is a list of stations which were affiliated with The WB in the United States at the time of the network's closure. The WB shut down September 17, 2006. Former affiliates of The WB became affiliates of The CW, MyNetworkTV, another network, reverted to independent status, or shut down entirely. Some WB affiliates dropped WB programming on September 5, 2006 in favor of MyNetworkTV.

The WB as a network, due to parent company Time Warner's heavy involvement in cable systems, could not have conventional owned-and-operated stations. Tribune Broadcasting was an initial investor in the network and owned many of its largest-market stations. In addition, the network backed a separately owned group seeking to improve the network's national reach. This group materialized in January 1997 as ACME Television Holdings (in reference to Wile E. Coyote and the Road Runner cartoons), owned by WB network president Jamie Kellner.

In smaller markets, beginning in 1998, WB network service was provided by a group of cable-only "stations" known first as The WeB and from 1999 as The WB 100+ Station Group. These cable channels, which utilized fictional call signs and were positioned like local stations, aired WB and syndicated programming and were established in partnership with local TV stations and cable systems in their respective markets. They are listed with no channel assignment (as some were on different channels by cable system) and denoted by ^{100+}. Further information on these services can be found at The WB 100+ Station Group.

Affiliates of The WB at closure
Media market	State/Dist./Terr.	Station	Channel	Notes
Birmingham	Alabama	WTTO	17	
Bessemer	Alabama	WDBB	21	
Dothan	Alabama	WBDO^{100+}	—N/a	
Huntsville	Alabama	WAWB	—N/a	(Note: Not a WB 100+ station. Provided on cable and, in later years, as a digital subchannel of WZDX.)
Mobile	Alabama	WBPG	55	
Montgomery	Alabama	WBMY^{100+}	—N/a	
Anchorage	Alaska	KWBX^{100+}	—N/a	
Fairbanks	Alaska	KWBX^{100+}	—N/a	
Juneau	Alaska	KWJA^{100+}	—N/a	
Phoenix	Arizona	KASW	61	
Tucson	Arizona	KWBA-TV	58	
Yuma	Arizona	KWUB^{100+}	—N/a	
Fort Smith	Arkansas	KBBL-TV	34	
Jonesboro	Arkansas	KJOS^{100+}	—N/a	
Little Rock	Arkansas	KWBF	42	
Bakersfield	California	KWFB^{100+}	—N/a	
Chico–Redding	California	KIWB^{100+}	—N/a	
Eureka	California	KWBT^{100+}	—N/a	
Fresno	California	KFRE-TV	59	
Los Angeles	California	KTLA	5	
Monterey	California	KMWB^{100+}	—N/a	
Palm Springs	California	KCWB^{100+}	—N/a	
Sacramento	California	KQCA	58	
San Diego	California	KSWB-TV	69	
San Francisco	California	KBWB	20	
San Luis Obispo	California	KWCA^{100+}	—N/a	
Denver	Colorado	KWGN-TV	2	
Grand Junction	Colorado	KWGJ^{100+}	—N/a	
Hartford–New Haven	Connecticut	WTXX	20	
Washington	District of Columbia	WBDC-TV	50	
Fort Myers	Florida	WTVK	46	
Gainesville	Florida	WBFL^{100+}	—N/a	
Jacksonville	Florida	WCWJ	17	
Miami–Fort Lauderdale	Florida	WBZL	39	
Orlando	Florida	WKCF	18	
Panama City	Florida	WBPC^{100+}	—N/a	
Tallahassee	Florida	WFXU^{100+}	17	
Tampa	Florida	WTTA	38	
West Palm Beach	Florida	WTCN-CA	43	
Albany	Georgia	WBSK^{100+}	—N/a	
Atlanta	Georgia	WATL	36	
Augusta	Georgia	WBAU^{100+}	—N/a	
Columbus	Georgia	WBG^{100+}	—N/a	
Macon	Georgia	WBMN^{100+}	—N/a	
Savannah	Georgia	WBVH^{100+}	—N/a	
Honolulu	Hawaii	KHII-TV	5	
Boise	Idaho	KWOB^{100+}	—N/a	
Idaho Falls	Idaho	KPIF	15	
Twin Falls	Idaho	KWTE^{100+}	—N/a	
Champaign–Springfield	Illinois	WBUI	23	
Chicago	Illinois	WGN-TV	9	(Note: Kids WB programs aired on WCIU-TV (channel 26) in Chicago.)
Peoria	Illinois	WBPE^{100+}	—N/a	
Quincy	Illinois	WEWB^{100+}	—N/a	
Rockford	Illinois	WBR^{100+}	—N/a	
Evansville	Indiana	WAZE-TV	19	
Fort Wayne	Indiana	WBFW^{100+}	—N/a	
Indianapolis	Indiana	WTTV	4	
South Bend	Indiana	WMWB-LP	25	
Terre Haute	Indiana	WBI^{100+}	—N/a	
Burlington	Iowa	KGWB-TV	26	
Cedar Rapids	Iowa	KWKB	20	
Des Moines	Iowa	KPWB-TV	23	
Ottumwa	Iowa	KWOT^{100+}	—N/a	
Sioux City	Iowa	KXWB^{100+}	—N/a	
Topeka	Kansas	WBKS^{100+}	—N/a	
Wichita	Kansas	KWCV	33	
Bowling Green	Kentucky	WBWG^{100+}	—N/a	
Louisville	Kentucky	WBKI-TV	34	
Paducah	Kentucky	WDKA	49	
Alexandria	Louisiana	KBCA	41	
Baton Rouge	Louisiana	WBRL-CA	21	
Lafayette	Louisiana	KLWB	50	
Lake Charles	Louisiana	WBLC^{100+}	—N/a	
Morgan City	Louisiana	KWBJ-LP	39	
Monroe	Louisiana	KWMB^{100+}	—N/a	
New Orleans	Louisiana	WNOL-TV	38	
Shreveport	Louisiana	KSHV-TV	45	
Bangor	Maine	WBAN^{100+}	—N/a	
Portland	Maine	WPXT	51	
Presque Isle	Maine	WBPQ^{100+}	—N/a	
Baltimore	Maryland	WNUV	54	
Salisbury	Maryland	WBD^{100+}	—N/a	
Boston	Massachusetts	WLVI	56	
Springfield	Massachusetts	WBQT^{100+}	—N/a	
Alpena	Michigan	WBAE^{100+}	—N/a	
Battle Creek	Michigan	WZPX-TV	43	
Detroit	Michigan	WDWB	20	
Flint	Michigan	WBSF^{100+}	—N/a	(Note: WBSF was operated as a digital subchannel with cable carriage by WEYI-TV beginning in 2004 as WBBC (changed to WBSF in 2005). A construction permit for a full-power station of the same name on channel 46 had been obtained but was not activated until September 2006, in time for the launch of The CW.)
Lansing	Michigan	WBL^{100+}	—N/a	
Marquette	Michigan	WBMK^{100+}	—N/a	
Traverse City	Michigan	WBVC^{100+}	—N/a	
Duluth	Minnesota	KWBD^{100+}	—N/a	
Mankato	Minnesota	KWYE^{100+}	—N/a	
Minneapolis–Saint Paul	Minnesota	WUCW	23	
Rochester	Minnesota	KWBR^{100+}	—N/a	
Biloxi	Mississippi	WBGP^{100+}	—N/a	
Columbus	Mississippi	WBWP^{100+}	—N/a	
Greenwood	Mississippi	WBWD^{100+}	—N/a	
Hattiesburg	Mississippi	WBH^{100+}	—N/a	
Jackson	Mississippi	WDBD	40	(Note: WDBD was the WB affiliate at the announcement of The WB's closure. WDBD switched to Fox in July 2006, and WB programs aired on WUFX (channel 35) for the remainder of the network's run.)
Meridian	Mississippi	WBMM^{100+}	—N/a	
Jefferson City	Missouri	KJWB^{100+}	—N/a	
Joplin	Missouri	KSXF^{100+}	—N/a	
Kansas City	Missouri	KSMO-TV	62	
Springfield	Missouri	KWBM	31	
St. Joseph	Missouri	WBJO^{100+}	—N/a	
St. Louis	Missouri	KPLR-TV	11	
Billings	Montana	KWBM^{100+}	—N/a	
Bozeman	Montana	KWXB^{100+}	—N/a	
Butte	Montana	KWZB^{100+}	—N/a	
Great Falls	Montana	KWGF^{100+}	—N/a	
Helena	Montana	KMTF	10	
Missoula	Montana	KIDW^{100+}	—N/a	
Lincoln	Nebraska	KOWH	51	(Note: KOWH began very late in the network's life, in June 2006. Prior to then, KWBL^{100+} served this market. KOWH had already been designated for The CW and changed call signs to KCWL-TV on August 1, 2006.)
North Platte	Nebraska	KWPL^{100+}	—N/a	
Omaha	Nebraska	KXVO	15	
Las Vegas	Nevada	KVWB	21	
Reno	Nevada	KREN-TV	27	
Albuquerque	New Mexico	KWBQ	19	
Roswell	New Mexico	KRWB-TV	21	
Albany	New York	WEWB-TV	45	
Binghamton	New York	WBXI^{100+}	—N/a	
Buffalo	New York	WNYO-TV	49	
Elmira	New York	WBE^{100+}	—N/a	
New York City	New York	WPIX	11	
Rochester	New York	WRWB	—N/a	
Syracuse	New York	WNYS-TV	43	
Utica	New York	WBU^{100+}	—N/a	
Watertown	New York	WBWT^{100+}	—N/a	
Charlotte	North Carolina	WWWB	55	
Greensboro	North Carolina	WTWB-TV	20	
Greenville	North Carolina	WGWB^{100+}	—N/a	
Raleigh–Durham	North Carolina	WLFL	22	
Wilmington	North Carolina	WBW^{100+}	—N/a	
Bismarck	North Dakota	KWMK^{100+}	—N/a	
Fargo	North Dakota	WBFG^{100+}	—N/a	
Cincinnati	Ohio	WSTR-TV	64	
Cleveland	Ohio	WBNX-TV	55	
Columbus	Ohio	WWHO	53	(Note: Shared affiliation with UPN.)
Dayton	Ohio	WBDT	26	
Lima	Ohio	WBOH^{100+}	—N/a	
Toledo	Ohio	WT05	—N/a	(Note: Cable-only station outside of the WB 100+ Station Group.)
Youngstown	Ohio	WBCB^{100+}	—N/a	
Zanesville	Ohio	WBZV^{100+}	—N/a	
Oklahoma City	Oklahoma	KOCB	34	
Tulsa	Oklahoma	KWBT	19	
Bend	Oregon	KWBO^{100+}	—N/a	
Eugene	Oregon	KZWB^{100+}	—N/a	
Medford	Oregon	KMFD^{100+}	—N/a	
Portland	Oregon	KWBP	32	
Erie	Pennsylvania	WBEP^{100+}	—N/a	
Harrisburg	Pennsylvania	WPMT	43	(Note: Secondary affiliation)
Philadelphia	Pennsylvania	WPHL-TV	17	
Pittsburgh	Pennsylvania	WCWB	22	
Scranton	Pennsylvania	WSWB	38	
Williamsport	Pennsylvania	WILF	53	
Providence	Rhode Island	WLWC	28	
Charleston	South Carolina	WBLN^{100+}	—N/a	
Columbia	South Carolina	WBHQ	63	
Greenville	South Carolina	WBSC-TV	40	
Myrtle Beach	South Carolina	WFWB^{100+}	—N/a	
Rapid City	South Dakota	KWBH-LP	27	
Sioux Falls	South Dakota	KWSD	36	
Chattanooga	Tennessee	WFLI-TV	53	
Jackson	Tennessee	WBJK^{100+}	—N/a	
Knoxville	Tennessee	WBXX-TV	20	
Memphis	Tennessee	WLMT	30	
Nashville	Tennessee	WNAB	58	
Abilene	Texas	KWAW^{100+}	—N/a	
Amarillo	Texas	KDBA^{100+}	—N/a	
Austin	Texas	KNVA	54	
Beaumont–Port Arthur	Texas	KWBB^{100+}	—N/a	
Corpus Christi	Texas	KWDB^{100+}	—N/a	
Dallas–Fort Worth	Texas	KDAF	33	
Harlingen	Texas	KMHB^{100+}	—N/a	
Houston	Texas	KHWB	39	
Laredo	Texas	KTXW^{100+}	—N/a	
Lubbock	Texas	KWBZ-TV	22	(Note: The WB had only just transitioned from a WB 100+ service on cable to over-the-air broadcast on January 1, 2006.)
Midland–Odessa	Texas	KWWT	30	
San Angelo	Texas	KWSA^{100+}	—N/a	
San Antonio	Texas	KRRT	35	
Sherman	Texas	KSHD^{100+}	—N/a	
Tyler	Texas	KWTL^{100+}	—N/a	
Victoria	Texas	KWVB^{100+}	—N/a	
Waco	Texas	KWKT-TV	44	
Wichita Falls	Texas	KWB^{100+}	—N/a	
Salt Lake City	Utah	KUWB	30	
Burlington	Vermont	WFFF-TV	44	
Bristol	Virginia	CYB.WB	—N/a	(Note: Operated by WCYB-TV but never used a fake call sign.)
Charlottesville	Virginia	WBC^{100+}	—N/a	
Harrisonburg	Virginia	WBHA^{100+}	—N/a	
Norfolk	Virginia	WTVZ-TV	33	
Richmond	Virginia	WWBT	12	
Roanoke	Virginia	WBVA	—N/a	(Note: Not a WB 100+ station. Provided on cable and, in later years, as a digital subchannel of WFXR and WJPR.)
Seattle	Washington	KTWB-TV	22	
Spokane	Washington	KSKN	22	
Yakima and Kennewick	Washington	KWYP^{100+}	—N/a	
Bluefield	West Virginia	WBB^{100+}	—N/a	
Clarksburg	West Virginia	WVWB^{100+}	—N/a	
Huntington–Charleston	West Virginia	WHCP	30	
Parkersburg	West Virginia	WBPB^{100+}	—N/a	
Wheeling	West Virginia	WBG^{100+}	—N/a	
Eau Claire and La Crosse	Wisconsin	WBCZ^{100+}	—N/a	
Green Bay	Wisconsin	WCWF	11	
Madison	Wisconsin	WBUW	57	
Milwaukee	Wisconsin	WVTV	18	
Wausau	Wisconsin	WBWA^{100+}	—N/a	
Casper	Wyoming	KWWY^{100+}	—N/a	
Cheyenne	Wyoming	KCHW^{100+}	—N/a	

== See also ==
- The WB
- The WB 100+ Station Group
