= KNEP =

Television station in Sidney, Nebraska

Semi-satellites of KGWN-DT2, Cheyenne, Wyoming and KSTF-DT2, Scottsbluff, Nebraska
- Sidney—Scottsbluff, Nebraska; United States
- City: Sidney, Nebraska
- Channels: Digital: 7 (VHF); Virtual: 4
- Branding: KGWN Scottsbluff

Programming
- Affiliations: 4.2: NBC

Ownership
- Owner: Marquee Broadcasting; (Marquee Broadcasting West, Inc.)
- Sister stations: KSTF

History
- First air date: March 5, 1958
- Former call signs: KDUH-TV (1958–2016)
- Former channel numbers: Analog: 4 (VHF, 1958–2009)
- Former affiliations: CBS (primary 1958−1965, joint primary 1965−1976, secondary 1976−1981); NBC (secondary 1958–1970, joint primary 1970−1976, sole primary 1976–1984); ABC (secondary 1958−1965, joint primary 1965–1970, sole primary via KOTA-TV 1984–2020); Fox (via KEVN-LD, 2020−2022)
- Call sign meaning: Nebraska Panhandle

Technical information
- Licensing authority: FCC
- Facility ID: 17683
- ERP: 32 kW
- HAAT: 475 m (1,558 ft)
- Transmitter coordinates: 41°50′27.9″N 103°4′28.8″W
- Translator(s): KSTF 10.2 Scottsbluff; KGWN-TV 5.2 Cheyenne, WY

Links
- Public license information: Public file; LMS
- Website: www.wyomingnewsnow.tv

KNEP (channel 4) is a television station in Sidney, Nebraska, United States, serving the Nebraska Panhandle as an affiliate of NBC. It is owned by Marquee Broadcasting alongside Cheyenne, Wyoming–licensed dual CBS/CW+ affiliate KGWN-TV (channel 5). KNEP's studios are located on 1st Avenue in Scottsbluff, and its transmitter is located in Angora, Nebraska.

== History ==
The station signed on for the first time on March 5, 1958, as KDUH-TV, with studios in Hay Springs, Nebraska. The station was owned by Helen Duhamel, whose last name formed the basis of the callsign. It was a semi-satellite of the original KOTA-TV in Rapid City (license now held by KHME). Like its parent, it carried programming from all four major networks, but was a primary CBS affiliate.

In 1965, in tandem with its parent, KDUH took on an unusual joint primary affiliation with CBS and ABC, slightly favoring CBS. This caused a good deal of confusion for viewers in the Nebraska Panhandle, since future sister station KSTF, which had signed on from Scottsbluff three years earlier in 1955, also held a joint primary affiliation with CBS and ABC, slightly favoring ABC. It was not unheard of for both stations to air the same program at the same time. However, in 1970, KOTA-TV and its repeaters exchanged CBS programming for NBC, replacing KRSD-TV (channel 7) as the NBC affiliate for Rapid City.

In 1969, KDUH-TV won approval to replace its original facility in Hay Springs with a new, 2,000-foot (610 m) tower near Hemingford, in Box Butte County. The new tower added Scottsbluff to its coverage area, giving that city a second television station alongside KSTF. The mast was erected in mid-1970, rising to its full steel height in September. The antenna arrived then and was put into place so the station could activate the new transmitter in October. When completed, the new Hemingfors tower was the tallest structure in Nebraska; in 1998, skydivers from Utah jumped from the tower, which they considered their "Holy Grail".

In 1971, Duhamel Broadcasting applied to move KDUH-TV's studios from Hay Springs to Scottsbluff. It cited the falling population and failing education system in Hay Springs as well as trouble maintaining personnel. The station's new manager, Al Brinkman, was unwilling to work in Hay Springs; he had taken the job on condition that he be allowed to live and work in Scottsbluff. A new petition was filed in 1973, seeking to be allowed to identify as "Scottsbluff-Hay Springs". On a third attempt in 1981, KDUH-TV was allowed to move its license and studios to Scottsbluff. In 1988, KDUH consolidated its operations at KOTA-TV.

Affiliation switches in Rapid City affected KDUH. In 1976, KRSD-TV left the air after having its license renewal denied. Its replacement, KEVN-TV, became a primary ABC affiliate, leaving CBS programs to air on KOTA-TV and repeaters. The two Rapid City stations split CBS programming until KELO-TV of Sioux Falls opened a Rapid City translator in 1981. In 1984, KOTA-TV switched from NBC to ABC. KDUH was a secondary affiliate of Fox in the 1990s.

=== 2002 tower collapse ===
On September 24, 2002, the KDUH-TV tower in Hemingford collapsed during tower work, replacing burned-out lights. Two workers on the tower—Lawrence A. Sukalec, 59, of Valier, Illinois, and Daniel E. Goff, 25, of Sesser, Illinois—were killed, and two more conducting maintenance on the transmitter building and a bystander were injured. Investigations later found that the contractors neglected to stabilize the tower while original structural components were being replaced with stronger ones.

The immediate effect of the collapse was to cut KDUH-TV off from many viewers and cut many viewers from ABC network programming. In some areas, Charter Communications had a direct fiber-optic link to KDUH and could continue to televise it. Other cable systems imported KMGH-TV of Denver or WXYZ-TV of Detroit, while some could not offer a replacement affiliate. By January 2003, the station claimed to have restored service to 70 to 80 percent of viewers. In Scottsbluff, low-power channel 2 began broadcasting KDUH programming, and a low-power digital signal went into service. K02NY in Chadron also rebroadcast KDUH.

In January 2003, KDUH announced it would rebuild, but not at Hemingford. Duhamel's insurer found the work a "non-covered event" and refused to pay out on the company's insurance claim. To save money while retaining most viewership, Duhamel opted to build a shorter tower at Angora, east of Scottsbluff. The 1,475-foot (450 m) Angora tower began operating on September 19, 2003.

=== Schurz and Gray ownership ===
Bill Duhamel announced on October 31, 2013, that KOTA-TV and its satellites (including KDUH-TV) would be sold to Schurz Communications' subsidiary Rushmore Media Company, pending FCC approval. The FCC granted the sale on March 31, 2014; and it was completed on April 28, 2014.

On September 14, 2015, Schurz announced that it would exit broadcasting and sell its television and radio stations, including KDUH-TV, to Gray Television for $442.5 million. In its original filing with the FCC, Gray said that KDUH would be converted to a satellite of KNOP-TV, a Gray-owned NBC affiliate in North Platte. In a subsequent filing with the FCC, Gray requested change the KDUH-TV call letters to KNEP following its conversion to a KNOP-TV satellite. It also sought to change KDUH/KNEP's city of license to Sidney, Nebraska. By changing its city of license, KNEP was now officially reckoned as part of the Denver market rather than the Cheyenne–Scottsbluff market, eliminating an ownership conflict with KSTF in Scottsbluff, a semi-satellite of KGWN-TV in Cheyenne, Wyoming. The FCC does not allow one company to own two of the four highest-rated stations in the market. Additionally, the Cheyenne–Scottsbluff market had only five full-power stations (KGWN and KSTF are counted as one station for ratings and regulatory purposes), which was three stations too few to legally permit a duopoly in any case.

The sale was approved by the FCC on February 12, 2016, and was completed on February 16. The FCC approved the change of station's city of license on May 16, making KDUH/KNEP a Denver DMA station. For all intents and purposes, however, it remained a de facto Scottsbluff station.

On May 5, 2016, the station officially became the NBC affiliate for the Nebraska Panhandle. Despite officially becoming a semi-satellite of KNOP-TV, the station formerly aired ABC programming from KOTA on channel 4.1 until 2020, when it was replaced with a simulcast of Fox programming from Rapid City-licensed KEVN-LD until 2022; initially, "NBC Nebraska Scottsbluff" was aired on channel 2.1. As of October 2021, NBC programming is seen on channel 4.1.

On December 8, 2023, KNEP re-branded from "NBC Nebraska Scottsbluff" to "KGWN Scottsbluff". The station continues to be rebroadcast on KGWN channel 5.2 in Cheyenne, Wyoming, as well as KSTF channel 10.2 in Scottsbluff.

=== Marquee Broadcasting ownership ===
On February 1, 2024, Gray announced that it was swapping its stations in the Cheyenne–Scottsbluff and Casper, Wyoming, markets to Marquee Broadcasting in exchange for the construction permit for KCBU in the Salt Lake City market.

== Newscasts ==
KNEP broadcast 8 1/2 hours of locally produced newscasts each week (with 1 1/2 hours each weekday and a half-hour each on Saturdays and Sundays).

As KDUH, the station produced full-length newscasts focused on the Nebraska Panhandle for years. However, due to cutbacks in later years, KDUH's newscasts were reduced to inserts in KOTA's weeknight newscasts with a few personalities locally based in Scottsbluff.

On May 5, 2016, KNEP's full-length localized newscasts in Scottsbluff were reinstated, upon the launch of NBC Nebraska Scottsbluff. The Scottsbluff news operation was shut down in February 2024 ahead of the swap to Marquee Broadcasting; KNEP's newscasts were replaced with a simulcast of KGWN-TV's Wyoming News Now. Seven staffers were laid off.

== Technical information ==
=== Subchannels ===
KNEP is broadcast from a tower east of Angora, Nebraska. The station's signal is multiplexed:

Subchannels of KNEP
Channel	Res.	Short name	Programming
4.2	720p	KNEP-HD	NBC

=== Analog-to-digital conversion ===
KNEP (as KDUH-TV) shut down its analog signal, over VHF channel 4, on February 17, 2009, the original target date on which full-power television stations in the United States were to transition from analog to digital broadcasts under federal mandate (which was later pushed back to June 12). The station's digital signal remained on its pre-transition VHF channel 7, using virtual channel 4.
