= The WB 100+ Station Group =

National feed of The WB for smaller markets

- Country: United States
- Broadcast area: Nationwide in smaller demographic market areas with no over-the-air affiliate
- Network: The WB
- Affiliates: (see section)
- Headquarters: Burbank, California

Programming
- Language: English
- Picture format: 480i (SDTV)

Ownership
- Owner: Warner Bros. Entertainment (Time Warner); Tribune Company

History
- Launched: September 21, 1998; 27 years ago
- Closed: September 17, 2006; 19 years ago (7 years, 361 days)
- Replaced by: The CW Plus
- Former names: The WeB (1998–1999, developmental name)

The WB 100+ Station Group (originally called The WeB from its developmental stages until March 1999) was a national programming service of The WB—owned by the Warner Bros. Entertainment division of Time Warner, the Tribune Company, and group founder and longtime WB network president Jamie Kellner—intended primarily for American television markets ranked #100 and above by Nielsen Media Research estimates. Operating from September 21, 1998 to September 17, 2006, The WB 100+ comprised an affiliate group that was initially made exclusively of individually branded cable television channels serving areas that lacked availability for a locally based WB broadcast affiliate and supplied a nationalized subfeed consisting of WB network and syndicated programs; in the network's waning years, the WB 100+ group began maintaining primary affiliations on full-power and low-power stations in certain markets serviced by the feed.

The WB 100+ Station Group was also essentially structured as a de facto national feed of The WB, and maintained a master schedule of syndicated and brokered programs for broadcast on all affiliates of the feed outside of time periods designated for The WB's prime time, daytime and Saturday morning programming. Programming and promotional services for The WB 100+ were housed at The WB's corporate headquarters in Burbank, California; engineering and master control operations were based at the California Video Center (Warner Bros. Ranch) in Burbank.

== History ==
=== Pre-launch ===
The history of The WB 100+ can be traced back to a charter affiliation agreement reached on December 3, 1993, between The WB and Tribune Broadcasting (whose corporate parent, the Tribune Company (later Tribune Media), held minority ownership in the network), which resulted in Tribune's Chicago television flagship WGN-TV carrying The WB's prime time programming (the Kids' WB block – which debuted in September 1995, eight months after The WB's launch – would air instead on independent station WCIU-TV before moving to WGN-TV in September 2004).

Through that deal, WGN's national superstation feed (later separately branded as WGN America and operating as a conventional basic cable channel) would act as a default WB affiliate for select markets where the network would have difficulty securing an affiliation with a broadcast television station at The WB's launch on January 11, 1995 (either due to the lack of available over-the-air stations or the absence of a secondary affiliation with an existing station within the market). This arrangement was conceived to give the network enough time to find affiliates in those "white areas" (a term referring to areas in which a national broadcaster does not have market clearance), allowing the WGN superstation feed to nationally distribute The WB's programming to a broader audience than would be possible without such an agreement in the interim. Some cable providers also carried either Los Angeles affiliate KTLA (for areas in the Pacific Time Zone) or New York City affiliate WPIX (for areas in the Eastern Time Zone) depending on the location in addition to or in lieu of WGN's national feed.

=== Development and launch ===
Jamie Kellner – co-founder, and original president of The WB – conceived the concept of a cable-originated programming service that would serve smaller markets, originally titled The WeB, in June 1996; the network formally presented its concept for the service, which would function similarly to the reasoning behind the agreement with the WGN superstation feed, to cable providers on September 24 of that year. Kellner had previous experience in developing such a service; during his tenure as Fox's original network president from 1986 to 1993, Kellner developed a similar (but less localized) service, Foxnet, a cable channel owned by News Corporation (the corporate parent of Fox at the time) that operated from June 1991 to September 2006, and was the first cable channel that designed to distribute a broadcast network's programming directly to cable providers in smaller markets where the network could not maintain an exclusive affiliation due to the limited number of available commercial television stations. After Russell Myerson (who would serve as the group's executive vice president and general manager) joined The WB in 1997, Kellner came to Myerson with his idea for a national cable feed of the network that would distribute WB programming to these "white area" markets with five or fewer commercial stations (including some markets where UPN, which debuted five days after The WB launched, managed to obtain an affiliation).

Time Warner, the network's majority owner, commissioned IBM (for hardware and infrastructure) and Enterprise Systems Group (later known as Encoda and then Harris Corporation; contracted for software systems at the national and local level) to develop a national data server network that would digitally transmit local and national advertisements, promos, station identifications and customized logo bugs for each individual affiliate to headends operating the local WB 100+ affiliate in their home market. The network would be relayed to a "station in a box" (SIB), a 5.25-inch (13.3 cm) wireless PC-based system that was programmed to download (through a data feed distributed via satellite), store and insert advertising appropriate to the individual affiliate's home market in pre-determined time periods set through a playlist over the satellite-delivered national feed as well as to transfer the programming feeds, via a disseminated address header based on the affiliate's designated call letters. The SIB units – which cost $9,000 per unit – were sold to each prospective affiliate operator with costs fully shouldered by The WB; the SIBs held 90 minutes of programming material at a time, in addition to transmitting advertisements and program promotions, and logging previously aired ad spots. Affiliates trafficked local advertising via logfiles sent over the Internet to a Novar management system located at The WB's corporate offices, that handled trafficking, programming feed dissemination and local insertion to individual affiliates. All programming provided by the service was distributed to WB 100+ affiliates via a centralcasting hub based at the California Video Center in southwestern Los Angeles (near Los Angeles International Airport).

Originally slated for a September 8 launch, The WeB was launched at 7:00 p.m. Eastern Time on September 21, 1998 on 80 cable-only affiliates, reaching 2.8 million cable television subscribers in the United States – the largest simultaneous launch of a station group in the history of American television. The service (which was renamed The WB 100+ Station Group in March 1999) was created to serve a similar capacity that Superstation WGN held as a national distributor of The WB – the difference being that stations within The WB 100+ group were structured in the manner of a local broadcast station: local WB 100+ affiliates were managed by either a local cable provider or an affiliate of a larger over-the-air television station (usually those affiliated with networks that were established long before The WB debuted in January 1995), which may have produced some local programming – such as a prime time newscast – or televised local sporting events.

WB 100+ stations also aired local commercial inserts and promotions, although promotions for syndicated programs aired on the service omitted affiliate references (either in the form of verbal identification or use of the affiliate's logo) in favor of network branding and were not customized to reference the program's local airtime (all airtimes listed in syndicated program promos were based on their scheduling in the Eastern and Central Time Zones), with the announcer being used to read the promo's airtime card only identifying that the program airs "[today/tonight/tomorrow/day of week] on The WB". Each affiliate had their own individual branding (usually in the form of a fictional call sign, the combination of "The WB" name with either the parent station's city of license/cable franchise's service area or a regional descriptor of the area, or both).

As part of the initial six-year affiliation agreements signed in late 1997 and throughout 1998, cable providers that operated local WB 100+ affiliates received the service's programming free of charge, instead of being required to pay a carriage fee directly to the network (as providers were required to do when they agreed to carry Foxnet at its launch); in addition, affiliates and their advertising sales partners shared a percentage of the revenue earned through the sale of local ads. The WB 100+ was designed to comply with Nielsen regulations defining what constitutes a local station; this allowed viewership totals from the cable-only affiliates to be counted alongside the network's conventional broadcast affiliates to accurately count toward the national ratings for WB network programming.

As time went on, The WB 100+ expanded, increasing its body of cable-only affiliates, while also adding affiliations with conventional broadcast television stations in a few markets. By September 2001, The WB 100+'s national availability had increased to 7.4 million households. The service's programming reached 109 out of 111 television markets within those eligible to affiliate with The WB 100+, totaling nine million households by January 2005. By the time The WB ceased operations in September 2006, the only eligible market never to have been served by a WB 100+ affiliate was Lafayette, Indiana, which received WB programming via WTTK (a satellite station of WTTV, which later became a CW affiliate and is now a CBS affiliate) in the adjacent Indianapolis market.

In some markets where a local cable provider carried Superstation WGN upon the initial rollout of the service, a WB 100+ affiliate supplanted WGN as the local WB affiliate; though for a year following the launch of The WB 100+, programming duplication between the local WB 100+ affiliate and WGN persisted in some areas where a cable provider did not black out WB programming airing over the WGN superstation feed. As additional WB 100+ affiliates signed on, network management deemed that The WB's affiliate footprint was large enough to request that WGN drop its programming from the station's national feed in October 1999; the local WGN-TV Chicago signal remained a WB affiliate until the network's September 2006 shutdown (the WGN local feed – which later became the CW affiliate, and were disaffiliated with the CW on 2016, but returned to the CW affiliate on 2024 – would become available to U.S. viewers outside of the Chicago market in the spring of 2015, when it was added as part of the initial offerings of Channel Master's LinearTV service).

=== Transition to The CW Plus ===
On January 24, 2006, Time Warner and CBS Corporation announced that The WB and UPN would each be shut down; in turn, the two companies would partner to launch The CW Television Network, a new network that would feature some programs from The WB and UPN initially forming the nuclei of its schedule in September of that year. To coincide with the change, The CW announced on February 24, that it would start a service called The CW Plus, a group of primarily digital subchannels, analog and non-broadcast cable television outlets affiliated with the network, serving areas of the United States ranked below the top 99 television markets; this service is nearly identical in structure to The WB 100+, albeit with a more diversified body of affiliates. There was no guarantee that existing affiliates of The WB 100+ would automatically join The CW Plus, although the vast majority ultimately did, and programming transitioned seamlessly from The WB 100+ to the successor CW Plus service (for example, The Daily Buzz remained on The CW Plus until September 2014).

Since digital television allows multiple "subchannels" to be carried on a single over-the-air signal, most of the CW Plus' affiliates air on the multicast feeds of those stations that manage the affiliates. Thus, they are no longer technically "cable-only" and must now use the parent station's licensed callsigns instead of a fictional one (although some of the service's over-the-air affiliates use altered versions of the parent station's call letters – with an "E" often replacing the leader "W" or "K" – merely for identification purposes, both on-air and in Nielsen diary-tabulated ratings reports). However, some stations (such as WBVC in Northern Michigan; WBWO in Wheeling, West Virginia; CW Glendive in Glendive, Montana; KWMK in Bismarck, North Dakota; WBAE in Alpena, Michigan and KSXF in Joplin, Missouri) remain cable-exclusive outlets.

== Programming ==
The WB 100+ utilized a dual programming model which differed from the traditional network affiliate model used by WB-affiliated stations in large and medium-sized markets, in which the affiliate handled complete responsibility of providing syndicated and local programming to fill non-network timeslots. Instead, dayparts on WB 100+ affiliates without WB programming were programmed by the network, primarily with programs that were being carried at the time in national syndication – along with syndicated film packages that filled select weekend timeslots, and brokered programming (such as infomercials and religious programs) that was time-leased by The WB to fill most overnight and some early afternoon timeslots on the service; this relieved the WB 100+ affiliate's local owner of the duty of acquiring syndicated programming to fill timeslots not occupied by network content from The WB. This was similar to the programming strategy of Foxnet, though unlike The WB 100+, Foxnet was distributed as a conventional cable channel and local operators were not allowed to tailor the service to their local market with their own branding, or carry local news or sports programming.

In addition to the hour of programming provided by the Kids' WB Saturday morning block that featured content complying with the regulations, the remaining two hours of programming that fulfilled educational programming guidelines defined by the Children's Television Act was taken care of by The WB 100+, which carried syndicated E/I programs for broadcast on early Saturday afternoons immediately after the conclusion of the block for much of The WB 100+'s existence.

The parent station or cable franchise operator of the local WB 100+ affiliate maintained responsibility of selling local advertising for the station or cable-only outlet, with the service allocating time to affiliates to incorporate local commercial inserts during WB network and WB 100+-acquired syndicated programming. The WB offered a multi-tiered advertising sales plan to prospective affiliates allowing for the sale and transmission of commercials for local, regional and national businesses on the customized feed; it also handled responsibility for marketing campaigns customized for each affiliate that were developed through an in-house marketing department operated by The WB for the station group. The affiliate operator also held responsibility of acquiring alternative syndicated programming to substitute those provided by The WB 100+, if the rights to that program are held by another station in their market.

Though The WB itself never carried any national news programming of its own throughout its 11-year existence, in September 2002, The WB acquired the syndication rights to The Daily Buzz – a morning news and lifestyle program that, at the time, was produced by ACME Communications (a now-defunct media company founded by The WB's original CEO Jamie Kellner, which had all except one of its television stations affiliated with The WB, and was named after the Acme Corporation running gag seen in Warner Bros.' Looney Tunes animated shorts) – for broadcast on The WB 100+; the program was also syndicated to stations in markets that were not covered by either The WB 100+ or where ACME did not own a station.

The WB 100+ feed was originally designed for the Eastern and Pacific Time Zones, whose master schedules were formatted to align the start time of The WB's prime time programming with the network's broadcast affiliate feed; a Central Time Zone feed was added by the early 2000s, followed by an Alaska Time Zone feed that launched in 2005. As such, the Kids' WB and (from January to September 2006, following the conclusion of the weekday afternoon Kids' WB lineup) Daytime WB blocks, which were designed to be tape-delayed, were aired an hour earlier on affiliates – compared to their preferred scheduling – on affiliates in the Central, Mountain and Alaska time zones.

== List of WB 100+ affiliates ==
This is a list of WB 100+ stations as of September 2006, when The WB ceased operations as a broadcast network. Note that most "call letters" below are informal, as these stations did not broadcast over-the-air and as such, were not licensed by the Federal Communications Commission (FCC); there were a few exceptions. Some of the "fake" calls used by the cable-only WB affiliates may be the same as calls used by actual over-the-air stations, and may create confusion for some; such stations are identified in this list for disambiguation.

Media market	State	Branding	Partner station	Notes
Dothan	Alabama	WBDO	WTVY	
Montgomery	Alabama	WBMY	WSFA	
Anchorage	Alaska	KWBX	KTVA	
Fairbanks	Alaska	KWBX	KFXF	
Juneau	Alaska	KWJA		
Yuma	Arizona	KWUB	KSWT	
Fort Smith–Fayetteville	Arkansas	KBBL 34	KHBS	
Jonesboro	Arkansas	KJOS		
Bakersfield	California	KWFB; WB12	KGET-TV	
Chico–Redding	California	KIWB; WB10	KRCR-TV	(Note: Not to be confused with KIWB-LD in Boise, Idaho.)
Eureka	California	KWBT	KAEF-TV	(Note: Not to be confused with the former KWBT in Tulsa, Oklahoma, now KQCW-DT.)
Monterey	California	KMWB; WB17	KSBW	(Note: Not to be confused with the former KMWB in Minneapolis–St. Paul, Minnesota, now WUCW.)
Palm Springs	California	KCWB	KMIR-TV	(Note: Not to be confused with the former KCWB in Kansas City, Missouri, now KCWE.)
San Luis Obispo	California	KWCA; WB5	KSBY	
Grand Junction	Colorado	KWGJ	KKCO	
Gainesville	Florida	WBFL; WB10	WOGX	
Panama City	Florida	WBPC	WJHG-TV	
Tallahassee	Florida	WFXU 48; WBXT	WTWC-TV	
Albany	Georgia	WBSK		
Augusta	Georgia	WBAU; WB23	WAGT	
Columbus	Georgia	WBG	WXTX	
Macon	Georgia	WBMN; WB3	WMAZ-TV	
Savannah	Georgia	WBVH; WB13	WJCL	
Boise	Idaho	KWOB	KBOI-TV	
Idaho Falls	Idaho	KPIF 15		
Twin Falls	Idaho	KWTE	KMVT	
Peoria	Illinois	WBPE	WHOI	
Quincy	Illinois	WEWB; WB6	WGEM-TV	
Rockford	Illinois	WBR 14	WTVO	
Fort Wayne	Indiana	WBFW; WB37	WPTA	
Terre Haute	Indiana	WBI; WB3	WTWO	
Ottumwa	Iowa	KWOT	KYOU-TV	
Sioux City	Iowa	KXWB	KTIV	
Topeka	Kansas	WBKS; WB5	KSNT	
Bowling Green	Kentucky	WBWG		
Alexandria	Louisiana	KBCA 41; WB 41		
Lafayette	Louisiana	KLWB 50	KLFY-TV	
Lake Charles	Louisiana	WBLC	KPLC	
Monroe	Louisiana	KWMB; WB12	KNOE-TV	
Bangor	Maine	WBAN; WB 4	WABI-TV	
Presque Isle	Maine	WBPQ; WB13	WAGM-TV	
Salisbury	Maryland	WBD; WB3	WMDT	
Springfield	Massachusetts	WBQT; WB11, WB16	WWLP	
Alpena	Michigan	WBAE	WBKB-TV	
Lansing	Michigan	WBL; WB30	WLNS-TV and WLAJ	
Marquette	Michigan	WBMK	WLUC-TV	
Traverse City	Michigan	WBVC; WB61	WGTU	
Duluth	Minnesota	KWBD	WDIO-TV	
Mankato	Minnesota	KWYE	KEYC-TV	
Rochester	Minnesota	KWBR	KAAL	
Biloxi	Mississippi	WBGP		
Greenwood	Mississippi	WBWD	WABG-TV	
Hattiesburg	Mississippi	WBH		
Meridian	Mississippi	WBMM		(Note: Not to be confused with WBMM in Montgomery, Alabama.)
Tupelo	Mississippi	WBWP	WTVA	(Note: Not to be confused with WBWP-LD in West Palm Beach, Florida.)
Jefferson City	Missouri	KJWB; WB5	KMIZ	
Joplin	Missouri	KSXF	KSNF	
St. Joseph	Missouri	WBJO	KQTV	
Billings	Montana	KWBM	KULR-TV	(Note: Not to be confused with KWBM in Springfield, Missouri.)
Butte–Bozeman	Montana	KWXB	KTVM-TV and K42BZ	
Glendive	Montana	KWZB		
Great Falls	Montana	KWGF	KFBB-TV	
Helena	Montana	KMTF 10		
Missoula	Montana	KIDW	KECI-TV	
Lincoln	Nebraska	KCWL 51; KWBL	KHGI-TV	
North Platte	Nebraska	KWPL		
Reno	Nevada	KREN-TV 27		
Binghamton	New York	WBXI	WBNG	(Note: Not to be confused with WBXI-CD in Indianapolis, Indiana.)
Elmira	New York	WBE	WENY-TV	
Utica	New York	WBU	WKTV	
Watertown	New York	WBWT	WWTI	
Greenville	North Carolina	WGWB	WITN-TV	
Wilmington	North Carolina	WBW; WB29	WWAY	
Bismarck–Minot	North Dakota	KWMK	KXMB-TV and KXMC-TV	
Fargo	North Dakota	WBFG; WB8	KXJB-TV	
Lima	Ohio	WBOH; WB3	WLIO	
Zanesville	Ohio	WBZV	WHIZ-TV	
Bend	Oregon	KWBO	KTVZ	
Eugene	Oregon	KZWB; WB11	KMTR	
Medford	Oregon	KMFD	KTVL	
Erie	Pennsylvania	WBEP; Northwest PA's WB	WSEE-TV	
Charleston	South Carolina	WBLN; WB14	WCIV	
Myrtle Beach	South Carolina	WFWB	WPDE-TV	
Rapid City	South Dakota	KWBH-LP 27	KEVN-TV	
Sioux Falls	South Dakota	KWSD 36	KELO-TV	
Jackson	Tennessee	WBJK	WBBJ-TV	
Abilene	Texas	KWAW	KTXS-TV	
Amarillo	Texas	KDBA; WB11	KVII-TV	
Beaumont–Port Arthur	Texas	KWBB	KBMT	
Corpus Christi	Texas	KWDB; WB16, WB23	KRIS-TV	
Harlingen	Texas	KMHB; WB53	KRGV-TV	
Laredo	Texas	KTXW; Laredo's WB19	KGNS-TV	
Lubbock	Texas	KWBZ 43	KCBD	
Odessa–Midland	Texas	KWWT 30		
San Angelo	Texas	KWSA; WB14	KTXE-LP	
Sherman	Texas	KSHD	KTEN	
Tyler	Texas	KWTL	KLTV	
Victoria	Texas	KWVB		
Wichita Falls	Texas	KWB	KAUZ-TV	
Charlottesville	Virginia	WBC	WVIR-TV	
Harrisonburg	Virginia	WBHA		
Roanoke–Lynchburg	Virginia	WBVA		
Yakima	Washington	KWYP	KNDO	(Note: Not to be confused with KWYP-DT in Laramie, Wyoming.)
Bluefield	West Virginia	WBB; WB18	WVVA	
Clarksburg	West Virginia	WVWB	WDTV	
Parkersburg	West Virginia	WBPB		
Wheeling	West Virginia	WBWO; WB18	WTOV-TV	
Eau Claire	Wisconsin	WBCZ; WB15	WXOW	
Wausau	Wisconsin	WBWA; WB15	WAOW	
Casper–Riverton	Wyoming	KWWY	KGWC-TV	
Cheyenne	Wyoming	KCHW	KGWN-TV	

== See also ==
- The CW Plus
- WGN America
- Foxnet
