= KOTA-TV =

Television station in Rapid City, South Dakota

- Rapid City, South Dakota; United States
- Channels: Digital: 7 (VHF); Virtual: 3
- Branding: KOTA Territory

Programming
- Affiliations: 3.1: ABC; 7.1: Fox; for others, see § Subchannels

Ownership
- Owner: Gray Media; (Gray Television Licensee, LLC)
- Sister stations: KEVN-LD, KHME

History
- First air date: July 11, 1976
- Former call signs: KEVN-TV (1976–2016)
- Former channel numbers: Analog: 7 (VHF, 1976–2009); Digital: 18 (UHF, 2003–2009); Virtual: 7 (until 2016)
- Former affiliations: ABC (1976–1984); NBC (1984–1996); Fox (1996–2016)
- Call sign meaning: Dakota

Technical information
- Licensing authority: FCC
- Facility ID: 34347
- ERP: 43.5 kW
- HAAT: 204 m (669 ft)
- Transmitter coordinates: 44°4′0″N 103°15′3″W
- Repeaters: KOPA-CD 12.1 (UHF) Gillette, WY; KEVN-LD 3.1 (UHF) Rapid City, SD; for others, see § Rebroadcasters

Links
- Public license information: Public file; LMS
- Website: www.kotatv.com

KOTA-TV (channel 3) is a television station in Rapid City, South Dakota, United States, affiliated with ABC. It is owned by Gray Media alongside MeTV affiliate KHME (channel 23) and low-power Fox affiliate KEVN-LD (channel 7). The stations share studios on Skyline Drive in Rapid City, where KOTA-TV's transmitter is also located.

KOTA-TV operates two full-power satellite stations. KHSD-TV (channel 11) in Lead, South Dakota, serves the Black Hills proper; it can also be seen over the air in Rapid City. KSGW-TV (channel 12) in Sheridan, Wyoming, serves northern and northeast Wyoming. KHSD-TV's transmitter is located on Terry Peak near Spearfish, South Dakota, while KSGW-TV's transmitter is on Bosin Rock.

KOTA serves a large area in western South Dakota, eastern Montana, and eastern Wyoming. It calls its vast coverage area "KOTA Territory".

== History ==
=== KOTA-TV intellectual unit ===
Until 2016, the KOTA-TV call sign, along with the virtual channel 3 assignment and the ABC affiliation, were associated with the station now known as KHME (channel 23). KOTA-TV had gone on the air in 1955 as the first television station in western South Dakota. Owned by Helen Duhamel along with KOTA radio (1380 AM), it was originally a primary CBS affiliate. The station also had secondary affiliations with NBC (until 1958) and ABC; it took on a joint-primary affiliation with both CBS and ABC in 1965, dropped CBS for NBC in 1970, lost ABC in 1976, and carried a secondary CBS affiliation from 1976 until 1981. KOTA became an ABC affiliate in 1984, and also carried some Fox programming from 1994 to 1996. The KHSD-TV call letters and virtual channel 11 were previously associated with the station now known as KQME (channel 5), which had been a KOTA-TV satellite since 1966.

=== First Channel 7 license ===
Channel 7 debuted as KRSD-TV on January 21, 1958. It was owned by The Heart of the Black Hills Stations, a company controlled by John, Eli, and Henry Daniels, along with KRSD radio (1340 AM, now KTOQ). The station was a primary NBC affiliate, sharing ABC with the original KOTA-TV. Two years later, in January 1960, KRSD-TV started a satellite station on channel 5 in Lead, KDSJ-TV; the Daniels brothers already operated KDSJ radio (980 AM) in nearby Deadwood.

For most of its history, Heart of the Black Hills was under scrutiny from network officials, the viewing public, and the Federal Communications Commission (FCC) for substandard technical operations. In 1966 and 1967, FCC inspectors found numerous violations of FCC technical rules. In 1967, more than 2,000 viewers asked NBC and the FCC for help in improving the station's quality. In 1969, an FCC inspector deemed KRSD-TV/KDSJ-TV's signal unfit for broadcast. On September 13, 1970, NBC struck an affiliation deal with KOTA, and CBS programs moved to KRSD-TV.

In 1970, in response to the numerous complaints about KRSD-TV and KDSJ-TV's technical operations, FCC hearing examiner Thomas Donahue recommended granting the stations one-year license renewals, rather than the standard five-year renewal. However, the next year, the full commission unanimously voted 5–0 (with two abstentions) to overrule Donahue and deny the renewals outright. The final decision stated that KRSD-TV/KDSJ-TV had been out of compliance with technical standards since at least 1961, and that their signals had deteriorated to the point of unacceptability by "at least 1965". As a result, by 1966, Black Hills cable systems refused to carry KRSD-TV, forcing the FCC to allow area cable providers to pipe in stations from neighboring markets. It also criticized the Daniels brothers for failing to correct violations from earlier inspections—including what the FCC Broadcast Bureau described as some of the worst violations the FCC had ever uncovered. While a handful of radio stations had been ordered off the air for technical violations, it was the first time that the FCC had shuttered a television station due to technical issues.

Faced with having to go off the air at midnight on December 31, 1971; Heart of the Black Hills fought the decision. However, the denial was reaffirmed in July 1972. Nonetheless, the FCC allowed the Daniels to operate the stations under special temporary authority for another four years while it searched for a new licensee.

=== Launch of KEVN ===
Construction permits for a new channel 7 in Rapid City and a new channel 5 in Lead were granted to Dakota Broadcasting Company, owned by a group of Rapid City businessmen, in April 1975; that November, the stations were assigned the call signs KEVN-TV and KIVV-TV. Dakota Broadcasting soon announced a planned July 6, 1976, debut; meanwhile, financial difficulties prompted Heart of the Black Hills Stations to finally shut KRSD-TV and KDSJ-TV down for good on February 29, 1976, leaving the Black Hills region without a local CBS affiliate. However, area cable systems already carried Sioux Falls CBS affiliate KELO-TV, which had been trying to get into Rapid City for some time. After a four-month hiatus, KEVN and KIVV came on the air July 11 as full-time ABC affiliates. KOTA ended its joint-primary affiliation with ABC and NBC, switching to a primary affiliation with NBC and a secondary affiliation with CBS until 1981, when K15AC (channel 15), a translator of KPLO-TV from Reliance (itself a satellite of KELO-TV), took on the CBS affiliation. K15AC was upgraded to full-power operations in 1988 as KCLO-TV, a semi-satellite of KELO.

On June 24, 1984, KEVN took the NBC affiliation, while KOTA-TV took over KEVN's old ABC affiliation. NBC had finally lost patience with KOTA-TV's local preemptions (NBC had long been less tolerant of preemptions than the other networks). The swap brought KEVN in line with Sioux Falls sister station KDLT-TV; that station had been purchased by KEVN's owners in 1982 and made its own move from ABC to NBC in 1983. In 1985, Dakota Broadcasting sold KEVN/KIVV and KDLT to Heritage Communications for nearly $20 million. In 1987, following Tele-Communications Inc.'s purchase of a majority interest in Heritage Communications, the company spun off its television and radio stations to Heritage's management under the Heritage Media banner.

=== From NBC to Fox ===
Heritage Media announced in September 1995 that it would sell KEVN-TV and KIVV-TV to Blackstar, LLC, a minority-controlled company in which nonvoting equity interests were held by Fox Television Stations and Silver King Communications, for $14 million; the deal was completed on February 7, 1996. Blackstar immediately announced that KEVN would become a Fox affiliate; the affiliation change happened in July 1996. Prior to this, Fox programming was seen in the market primarily via cable carriage of Denver's KDVR or the national Foxnet service, while KOTA-TV had a secondary affiliation with Fox since 1994 to carry the network's coverage of the National Football League. NBC programming moved to a low-power station, KNBN-LP (initially on channel 24, now KKRA-LD; later on channel 27, now KWBH-LD); its owners would obtain a full-power license, KNBN (channel 21), in May 2000.

USA Networks (the former Silver King Communications), through its USA Broadcasting subsidiary, acquired Blackstar, LLC outright in 1998 as part of a larger deal between USA and Paxson Communications that saw USA take control of Atlanta's WNGM-TV from Paxson and Paxson buying Portland's KBSP-TV from Blackstar. USA mainly acquired Blackstar in order to incorporate its Orlando station, WBSF, into its planned "CityVision" group of independent stations, and soon sold KEVN-TV and KIVV-TV to Mission TV, LLC, an independent private company led by California attorney William Reyner, who at that time held partial stakes in fellow Fox affiliates KKFX-LP in Santa Barbara, California, and Smith Broadcasting-owned WFFF-TV in Burlington, Vermont. (Mission TV was not related to Mission Broadcasting, a holding company whose stations are controlled by Nexstar Media Group.)

KEVN filed for Chapter 11 bankruptcy protection on November 20, 2003, to prevent Finova Capital Corp., the station's largest creditor, from taking legal action to acquire control of the station; KEVN's programming and operations were not affected by this move, and the station emerged from bankruptcy in July 2005. In January 2007, after having been branded as "KEVN Fox 7" for its first 11 years as a Fox affiliate, the station changed its branding to "Black Hills Fox," removing the over-the-air channel number from KEVN's brand identity.

=== Sale to Gray Television ===
On December 18, 2013, it was announced that Mission TV would sell KEVN-TV and KIVV-TV to Gray Television for $7.75 million. Upon the completion of the sale on May 1, 2014, KEVN was Gray's first standalone full power Fox affiliate. On September 14, 2015, Gray announced that it would purchase the television and radio stations owned by Schurz Communications, including KOTA-TV and its satellites and the Rushmore Media Company group of radio stations, for $442.5 million. Gray intended to consolidate KOTA's operations with those of KEVN; in announcing the sale of most of KOTA-TV's assets to Legacy Broadcasting on October 1, Gray announced that KEVN-TV would inherit KOTA's ABC affiliation following the deal's completion.

On February 1, 2016, Gray moved the KOTA-TV intellectual unit–call letters, programming, ABC affiliation and staff–to RF channel 7, while moving the KEVN intellectual unit to low-powered KEVN-LD on RF channel 23. The station moved its virtual channel to 3, while continuing to transmit on RF channel 7, while KEVN-LD began transmitting on virtual channel 7. The former KOTA changed its call sign to KHME, and broadcasts MeTV and This TV subchannels on virtual channel 23, using KOTA's former RF channel 2.

A similar realignment took place with the two stations' satellites in Lead. Gray moved the KHSD intellectual unit to KEVN's satellite, KIVV. The former KHSD changed its calls to KQME, and serves as a satellite of KHME. This left Fox without a full-power signal in the western portion of the market. To make up for this shortfall, KEVN is simulcast on KHSD's second digital channel.

At the start of July 2024, the separate "Black Hills Fox" branding was discontinued for KEVN-LD and its simulcasts, and both KOTA and KEVN now feature the "KOTA Territory" branding across both stations vocally, without any mention of their affiliations. KEVN's logo now simply features the Fox logomark replacing that of ABC's, while keeping the black circle the ABC logo usually sits upon for the simplicity of branding both stations, with another version simply dispensing with an affiliation logo altogether.

== News operation ==
KOTA-TV presently broadcasts a total of 9 1/2 hours of locally produced newscasts each week (with 1 1/2 hours each weekday and one hour each on Saturdays and Sundays). The station is among the few Fox affiliates to carry a 6 p.m. newscast and one of the only Fox stations to offer a newscast in that timeslot that does not also produce a 5 p.m. newscast. The station also does not produce any newscasts during morning or midday timeslots, although KEVN rebroadcasts its hour-long 9 p.m. news program at 6 a.m. on weekday mornings.

Early in KEVN's Fox affiliation, the station produced an hour-long morning newscast at 7 a.m., as well as half-hour newscasts at noon, 5:30 p.m., and 10 p.m. (a holdover from its NBC affiliation); on weekends, KEVN only aired its late newscast. In 1998, the station moved the late newscast to 9 p.m., making it the first Rapid City station to produce a prime time newscast; KCLO-TV also airs a newscast at that time, but it is a simulcast of KELO-TV's Sioux Falls-based 10 p.m. newscast. Around the same time, the morning and midday newscasts were discontinued. By 2001, KEVN expanded the weeknight 9 p.m. news to an hour; the weekend edition of the newscast would be expanded to an hour as well on November 2, 2013. The station moved the early evening newscast to 6 p.m. on March 31, 2008, and relaunched it as The Six; station management stated that airing a newscast at that slot would allow KEVN to attract viewers unable to view the 5:30 newscasts on KOTA-TV and KNBN.

== Technical information ==
=== Subchannels ===
The stations' signals are multiplexed:

Subchannels of KOTA-TV and KHSD-TV
Channel		Res.	Short name		Programming
KOTA-TV	KHSD-TV	Res.	KOTA-TV	KHSD-TV	Programming
3.1	11.1	720p	ABC-HD	KHSDDT	ABC
3.2	11.2	480i	Outlaw	KHSDOUT	Outlaw (4:3)
3.3	11.3	480i	Justice	KHSDDT3	True Crime Network
3.4	11.4	480i	Grit	KHSDGRT	Grit
7.1		720p	FOX-HD	KHSDDT2	Fox (KEVN-LD)

Simulcast of subchannels of another station

Subchannels of KSGW-TV
Channel	Res.	Short name	Programming
12.1	720p	KSGW-DT	ABC
12.2	720p	KSGW-TV	Fox (KEVN-LD)

Simulcast of subchannels of another station

KSGW-TV previously carried a subchannel of KCWY-DT, the NBC affiliate in Casper, Wyoming, also owned by Gray. However, Sheridan is also located in the Rapid City television market. That prompted KNBN to assert its exclusive rights to NBC programming in Sheridan, supported by the network. As a result, Gray was forced to remove the KCWY subchannel from KSGW-TV on January 1, 2019.

=== Analog-to-digital conversion ===
Four months before the official date of the analog television shutdown and digital conversion on February 17, 2009, both stations shut down their analog signals:

- KOTA-TV (as KEVN-TV) shut down its analog signal, over VHF channel 7; the station's digital signal relocated from its pre-transition UHF channel 18 to VHF channel 7 for post-transition operations.
- KHSD-TV (as KIVV-TV) shut down its analog signal, over VHF channel 5; the station's digital signal relocated from its pre-transition UHF channel 29 to VHF channel 5 for post-transition operations.

Mission TV submitted an application to the FCC in 2007 asking to defer further construction of the station's digital transmitter (which was not yet operating at full-power due to financial problems) until the end of the digital television transition, indicating that its owners were the subject of a bankruptcy proceeding at the time and to expand the funds necessary to complete construction of its full-power digital television facility "could be fatal".

=== Rebroadcasters ===
==== Satellite stations ====
KOTA's programming is also shown on a network of three satellite stations.

Station	City of license (Other cities served)	Channel; VC (RF)	Subchannels	Facility ID	ERP	HAAT	Transmitter coordinates	First air date	Public license information
KHSD-TV	Lead, SD (Deadwood, SD)	11 (5)	7.1: Fox; 11.1: ABC	34348	9.2 kW	561 m (1,841 ft)	44°19′30″N 103°50′14″W	January 1960	Profile; LMS
KSGW-TV	Sheridan, WY (Gillette/Wright/Buffalo)	12 (13)	12.1: ABC; 12.2: Fox	17680	50 kW	372 m (1,220 ft)	44°37′23″N 107°7′2.3″W	December 28, 1977	Profile; LMS

KHSD operates as a full-time repeater of KOTA.

KNEP in Sidney, Nebraska, formerly was a semi-satellite of and simulcasted KOTA, airing separate commercials from studios in Scottsbluff. KNEP was formerly KDUH-TV, and aired its own full-length newscasts for years. However, due to cutbacks in later years, KDUH's newscasts were reduced to inserts in KOTA's weeknight newscasts with a few personalities locally based in Scottsbluff. On May 5, 2016, KNEP's full-length localized newscasts in Scottsbluff were reinstated, upon the launch of NBC Nebraska Scottsbluff which aired on KNEP's digital subchannel 4.2. The subchannel operated as a semi-satellite of North Platte's NBC affiliate, KNOP-TV. In 2020, the KOTA simulcast on KNEP was removed and replaced with a simulcast of sister station KEVN; which in turn was also removed in 2022; moving NBC programming from channel 2.1 to channel 4.1. ABC and Fox are still available in Scottsbluff via a translator of Cheyenne, Wyoming Fox affiliate KLWY (ABC is provided via a simulcast of Cheyenne's low-power ABC affiliate KKTQ-LD on channel 27.2; which in turn is a semi-satellite of KTWO-TV in Casper).

When KQME was being launched as KHSD-TV, KOTA-TV contracted with KDIX-TV in Dickinson, North Dakota (now KXMA-TV) to provide programming for that station, as KDIX was close enough to KHSD that its engineers would be able to pick up KHSD's signal. Consequently, KDIX was practically a satellite of KOTA from November 1966 until September 1970.

KOTA-TV is one of two ABC affiliates on Dish Network's Cheyenne–Scottsbluff local feed. The other is KTWO-TV in Casper, which is carried on Fox affiliate KLWY's digital subchannel.

==== Translators ====
- K14RX-D Ashland, MT (translates KHSD-TV)
- K03CS-D Broadus, MT (translates KSGW-TV)
- K18JE-D Broadus, MT (translates KHSD-TV)
- K09BE-D Ekalaka, MT (translates KHSD-TV)
- K31QA-D Deadwood, SD (translates KHSD-TV)
