= KCPL =

KCPL may refer to:

- Kansas City Power and Light Company
- Kansas City Public Library
- KCPL (FM), a radio station (90.5 FM) licensed to serve Astoria, Oregon, United States
- KCPL-LP, a defunct low-power television station (channel 52) formerly licensed to serve Rapid City, South Dakota, United States, a repeater of KCPO-LP
