= CW27 =

CW 27 may refer to:

== U.S. television stations affiliated with The CW ==
=== Current ===
- WFXR, on DT2 in Roanoke, Virginia
- WKYT-TV, on DT2 in Lexington, Kentucky
- WLOV-TV in West Point, Mississippi

=== Former ===
- KREN-TV in Reno, Nevada (2006 to 2009)
- KWBH-LD in Rapid City, South Dakota (2006 to 2017)
- WGNT in Portsmouth, Virginia (2006 to 2024)

== Other uses ==
- CW-27 Caravan, a 1940s American all-wood military transport aircraft
- (8948) 1997 CW27, a main-belt minor planet
