= KCPO =

KCPO may refer to:

- Knight Commander of the Pontifical Order of Pius IX, a class in one of the orders of knighthood of the Holy See
- KCPO-LD, a low-power television station (channel 26) licensed to serve Sioux Falls, South Dakota, United States
