= KABY =

KABY or Kaby may refer to:

- KABY-LD, a low-power television station (channel 20, virtual 15) licensed to serve Sioux Falls, South Dakota, United States
- KABY-TV, a defunct television station (channel 9) formerly licensed to serve Aberdeen, South Dakota
- Southwest Georgia Regional Airport (ICAO code KABY)
- Aliu Djaló, Portuguese footballer nicknamed Kaby
- Kaby Lake, a codename of Intel microprocessors
