= CW 15 =

CW 15 may refer to one of two television stations in the United States affiliated with the CW television network:

== Current ==
- KCLO-TV in Rapid City, South Dakota (owned-and-operated)
- WCWN in Schenectady–Albany–Troy, New York (cable channel; broadcasts on channel 45)
- WHDF in Huntsville–Florence, Alabama (O&O)

== Former ==
- KNXV-DT2 in Phoenix, Arizona (2023–2024)
- KXVO in Omaha, Nebraska (2006–2021)
