= Jim Burt (sportscaster) =

American sportscaster

Jim Burt (June 22, 1918 – July 5, 1993) was an American broadcast pioneer who spent forty years as sportscaster on KELO radio and television. He was named South Dakota's sportscaster of the year seven times.

== Biography ==
Jim Burt was born in Melcher, Iowa, on June 22, 1918. He graduated from Melcher High School in 1936 and then from Brown Institute in Minneapolis, Minnesota. Burt started broadcasting sports for KELO in June 1947. He broadcast every boys basketball tournament from 1948 to 1982, and was "the voice of the South Dakota Coyotes" from 1952 to 1977.

Jim Burt joined South Dakota's first television station, KELO-TV in Sioux Falls, South Dakota, when the station first went on the air in 1953. He served as the station's sports director. Burt retired in 1987.

In December 1994, an endowed scholarship fund was established in Jim Burt's memory within the University of South Dakota Foundation. The scholarship was called the "Jim Burt Memorial Scholarship for Broadcast Journalism Endowment."

Jim Burt died in Sioux Falls, South Dakota, on July 5, 1993, at the age of 75.
