= Captain 11 =

American children's TV show, 1955–1996

- Genre: children's program
- Starring: Dave Dedrick
- Country of origin: United States
- No. of seasons: 41

Production
- Running time: 30 minutes (with commercials)
- Production company: KELO-TV

Original release
- Release: March 7, 1955 – December 28, 1996

Captain 11 is an after-school children's program for over 41 years on KELO-TV, broadcast on channel 11 from Sioux Falls, South Dakota. Station weatherman Dave Dedrick donned a yellow-trimmed blue pilot uniform with hat and daily (later weekly as cable TV began to cut into its ratings) became the jolly host of the show. The show primarily played cartoons and other children's fare, and featured the Captain having all the kids (his "crew") introduce themselves on the air, guessing to win the toy chest, and children with birthdays working the Captain's control panel of lights and switches. The show ended with the Captain playing the "freezeberg" game with the children, having them: Face the camera and wave one hand: then wave both hands: followed by wave both hands and one foot then wave both hands and both feet which usually resulted in most of the kids jumping up and down while facing the camera. Finally, the Captain would tell them to "freeze", not moving a muscle as the camera panned over the crowd of kids attempting to remain still.

== The Captain 11 charge ==
The show opened with an animated space scene, slowly zooming in to the Captain's space ship, with this charge voiced over:

"Captain 11! Today's man of the future!"

One man in each century is given the power to control time. The man chosen to receive this power is carefully selected. He must be kind. He must be fair. He must be brave. You have fulfilled these requirements; and, we of the Outer Galaxies designate to you the wisdom of Solomon and the strength of Atlas. You are Captain 11!

== History ==
The show ran from March 7, 1955, to December 27, 1996, making it the longest continuously running children's television program in the United States. Dedrick's autobiography reveals interesting background about the show, like why the character's trademark rubber headphones were eventually discarded after many seasons, and how the set designers could not agree on a single design and eventually had to work independently on their own sections.

Dave Dedrick retired from broadcasting on December 30, 1996. He was inducted into the South Dakota Broadcasters Hall of Fame on April 18, 1997, and into the South Dakota Hall of Fame in 1999. Dedrick died in Sioux Falls on January 22, 2010, at the age of 81.

The Captain 11 set and other memorabilia is displayed in the State Historical Museum in Pierre.
