= KHME =

Television station in Rapid City, South Dakota

KHME and KQME

KHME: Rapid City, South Dakota; KQME: Lead, South Dakota; United States
- Channels for KHME: Digital: 2 (VHF); Virtual: 23
- Channels for KQME: Digital: 10 (VHF); Virtual: 5
- Branding: MeTV Rapid City

Programming
- Affiliations: 23.1/5.1: MeTV; for others, see § Subchannels

Ownership
- Owner: Gray Media; (Gray Television Licensee, LLC)
- Sister stations: KOTA-TV, KEVN-LD

History
- Founded: KHME: December 8, 1954
- First air date: KHME: June 1, 1955; KQME: November 2, 1966
- Former call signs: KHME: KOTA-TV (1955–2016); KQME: KHSD-TV (1966–2016)
- Former channel number: KHME: Analog: 3 (VHF, 1955–2009); Virtual: 3 (until 2016); KQME: Analog: 11 (VHF, 1966–2009); Virtual: 11 (until 2016); 10 (2016–2024)
- Former affiliations: CBS (primary 1955–1965, joint primary 1965−1970, secondary 1976−1981); ABC (secondary 1955−1965, joint primary 1965−1976, primary 1984–2016); NBC (secondary 1955−1958, joint primary 1970−1976, primary 1976–1984); Fox (secondary, 1994–1996)
- Call sign meaning: KHME: Black Hills MeTV; KQME: disambiguation of KHME

Technical information
- Licensing authority: FCC
- Facility ID: KHME: 17688; KQME: 17686
- ERP: KHME: 18.2 kW; KQME: 34.8 kW
- HAAT: KHME: 216 m (709 ft); KQME: 576 m (1,890 ft)
- Transmitter coordinates: KHME: 44°4′7.7″N 103°15′5″W; KQME: 44°19′35.1″N 103°50′9″W
- Translator: 18 (UHF) Rapid City

Links
- Public license information: KHME: Public file; LMS; KQME: Public file; LMS

KHME (channel 23) is a television station in Rapid City, South Dakota, United States, affiliated with the classic television network MeTV. It is owned by Gray Media alongside ABC affiliate KOTA-TV (channel 3) and low-power Fox affiliate KEVN-LD (channel 7). The stations share studios on Skyline Drive in Rapid City, where KHME's transmitter is also located.

KHME also operates a full-power satellite in Lead, South Dakota, KQME (channel 5), which can also be seen over-the-air in Rapid City. KQME's transmitter is located atop Terry Peak.

== History ==
KHME debuted on the air as KOTA-TV, with test operations on June 1, 1955, with regular programming beginning one month later on July 1. It was the second television station in South Dakota, and the first in the western part of the state. The station was owned by Rapid City businesswoman Helen Duhamel, and was a sister station to CBS Radio Network affiliate KOTA (1380 AM). Duhamel bought a minority stake in the radio station in 1943 and gradually expanded her holdings until she bought full control in 1954. Channel 3 originally carried programming from all three networks, though it was a primary CBS television affiliate. Helen's son William (Bill) Duhamel would become KOTA-TV's president and general manager in 1976.

When KRSD-TV, the original channel 7 in Rapid City, signed on in 1958, it took the NBC affiliation, sharing ABC with KOTA-TV. In 1965, channel 3 took on an unusual "joint primary" affiliation with CBS and ABC, slightly favoring CBS. It was certainly quite a struggle to fit as many network shows as possible onto the schedule, especially in the daytime, so KRSD-TV had to take up some of the slack. But channel 7 always had a painfully weak signal which, by 1966, had deteriorated to the point of unacceptability. For this reason, and at NBC's insistence, the two stations switched affiliations on September 13, 1970, making KOTA-TV a joint-primary affiliate of ABC and NBC. A year later, the Federal Communications Commission (FCC) would yank KRSD-TV's license due to its inadequate technical quality; that station's owner would fight the decision, but finally gave up and ceased operations on February 29, 1976.

For the next several months, KOTA-TV had only PBS station KBHE-TV (channel 9) as a competitor. But when the new channel 7, KEVN-TV, opened on July 11, 1976, it took all ABC programming; KOTA-TV kept its NBC primary affiliation and added a secondary affiliation with CBS. Meanwhile, in Scottsbluff, Nebraska, KSTF, along with its parent station KYCU-TV (now KGWN-TV) in Cheyenne, Wyoming, both had to switch their primary affiliations to ABC to make up for the loss of ABC programming on KDUH.

Channel 3 lost CBS in 1981, after the FCC authorized K15AC (channel 15), a translator of KPLO-TV from Reliance (itself a satellite of KELO-TV, the CBS affiliate in Sioux Falls), over the objections of KOTA-TV (K15AC was supplanted in 1988 by KCLO-TV, a semi-satellite of KELO). KOTA-TV continued to carry NBC programming until 1984, when the network chose to part ways with the station. ABC then moved its programming to channel 3 from KEVN-TV, which took the NBC affiliation; this made KOTA-TV one of the few stations to be a primary affiliate of each of the Big Three television networks. KOTA added a secondary affiliation with Fox in 1994, primarily to carry the network's coverage of the National Football League; this ended in July 1996, when KEVN switched from NBC to Fox as part of the U.S. television network affiliate switches of 1994.

After calling itself "The Great American West Television Network" in the 1980s, KOTA-TV rebranded as "KOTA Territory" in 1990.

After 58 years under family ownership, Bill Duhamel announced on October 31, 2013, that KOTA-TV and its satellites would be sold to Schurz Communications, pending FCC approval. The sale separated KOTA-TV from its longtime sister radio stations (which the Duhamels retained), as Schurz already owns a group of Black Hills radio stations under the New Rushmore Radio banner. The FCC granted the sale on March 31, 2014; and it was completed on April 28, 2014.

On September 14, 2015, Schurz announced that it would exit broadcasting and sell its television and radio stations, including KOTA-TV and its satellites, to Gray Television for $442.5 million. Gray already owned KEVN-TV in Rapid City, and intended to consolidate the two stations' operations. In its original filing with the FCC, Gray said that it would either sell or surrender the license for KOTA-TV, while retaining its three present satellite stations. KHSD-TV (channel 11) in Lead and KSGW-TV (channel 12) in Sheridan, Wyoming, were proposed to become satellites of KEVN-LD (channel 23), a new low-power station in Rapid City owned by Gray, while KDUH-TV (channel 4) in Scottsbluff would be converted to a satellite of KNOP-TV, a Gray-owned NBC affiliate in North Platte.

On October 1, Gray announced that the KOTA-TV license would be acquired by Legacy Broadcasting for $1; while Gray would retain the ABC affiliation and transfer it to KEVN-TV, most of the station's other assets, including its present subchannel affiliations with MeTV and This TV, were transferred to Legacy as part of the deal. The KHSD license will also be acquired by Legacy. In a subsequent filing with the FCC, Gray disclosed that it now planned to convert KSGW-TV to a semi-satellite of NBC affiliate KCWY-DT in Casper, Wyoming, while KDUH-TV would change its call letters to KNEP following its conversion to a KNOP-TV satellite; Gray also proposed to change KDUH/KNEP's city of license to Sidney, Nebraska (which moved it from the Cheyenne-Scottsbluff market to the Denver market, eliminating an ownership conflict with KSTF in Scottsbluff). The FCC approved the Schurz sale on February 12, 2016, The sale was completed on February 16, 2016. The FCC approved the KDUH/KNEP city of license change on May 16.

On February 1, 2016, KOTA-TV changed its call letters to KHME. Northpine reported that this was done as Gray Television awaited FCC approval of its Black Hills TV merger. The KOTA-TV callsign was moved to KEVN, the area Fox affiliate on February 1, 2016, with virtual channel 3 and the ABC affiliation moving there by February 24. The KEVN callsign, virtual channel 7 and Fox affiliation continues on KEVN-LD, channel 23. KHME retained the MeTV and This TV subchannels from the previous KOTA. KHME then changed its affiliation on DT2 from This TV to Heroes and Icons as of September 1, 2016.

On October 13, 2021, it was announced that KHME and KQME would be sold to Gray for $500,000; this would make KHME a sister station to KOTA-TV and KEVN-LD. The sale was completed on November 30.

== Technical information ==
=== Subchannels ===
The stations' signals are multiplexed:

Subchannels of KHME and KQME
Channel		Res.	Short name	Programming
KHME	KQME	Res.	Short name	Programming
23.1	5.1	720p	ME TV	MeTV
23.2	5.2	720p	H N I	Heroes & Icons
23.3	5.3	480i	StartTV	Start TV
23.4	5.4	480i	CATCHY	Catchy Comedy
23.5	5.5	480i	OXYGEN	Oxygen

In 2009, KOTA-TV and its satellite stations added the Retro Television Network and This TV on their digital subchannels. In 2011, Retro Television was replaced by MeTV on KOTA-TV and its satellite stations.

=== Translators ===
- KHME (DRT) Rapid City
- K07EQ-D Ekalaka, MT
- K08IP-D Baker, MT
- K09IV-D Plevna, MT
- K24DD-D Plevna, MT

=== Analog-to-digital conversion ===
KHME (as KOTA-TV) shut down its analog signal, over VHF channel 3, on June 12, 2009, the official date on which full-power television stations in the United States transitioned from analog to digital broadcasts under federal mandate. The station's digital signal remained on its pre-transition VHF channel 2, using virtual channel 3.

KHME also operates a fill-in translator on channel 18 that serves the immediate part of the Rapid City area.
