= Channel 1 branded TV stations in the United States =

The following television stations in the United States brand as channel 1 (though not using virtual channel 1; physical RF channel 1 on 44–50 MHz was removed in 1948):

This table is sorted ascending by call sign; click on any of the arrows to change how the table is sorted.

Call sign	City	State
KNBN	Rapid City	South Dakota
