= KCLO-TV =

Television station in Rapid City, South Dakota

Semi-satellite of KELO 11.4, Sioux Falls, South Dakota
- Rapid City, South Dakota; United States
- Channels: Digital: 16 (UHF); Virtual: 15
- Branding: KELOLAND CW; KELOLAND News; KELOXTRA (15.2)

Programming
- Affiliations: 15.1: The CW; 15.2: Independent; for others, see § Subchannels

Ownership
- Owner: Nexstar Media Group; (Nexstar Media Inc.)

History
- Founded: September 26, 1981 (as translator K15AC)
- First air date: November 28, 1988
- Former call signs: KBLO-TV (1987–1988)
- Former channel numbers: Analog: 15 (UHF, 1987–2009)
- Former affiliations: CBS (as a semi-satellite of KELO-TV, 1988–2026)
- Call sign meaning: disambiguation of KELO

Technical information
- Licensing authority: FCC
- Facility ID: 41969
- ERP: 150 kW
- HAAT: 154 m (505 ft)
- Transmitter coordinates: 44°4′13″N 103°15′3″W

Links
- Public license information: Public file; LMS
- Website: www.keloland.com; KELOLAND CW website

KCLO-TV (channel 15) is a television station in Rapid City, South Dakota, United States, airing programming from The CW. Owned by Nexstar Media Group, the station operates a news bureau and sales office on Canyon Lake Drive in Rapid City, with its transmitter located on Skyline Drive near the downtown area.

Although identifying as a separate station in its own right, KCLO-TV is considered a semi-satellite of sister station KELO-TV (channel 11) in Sioux Falls, which operates two other semi-satellites: KDLO-TV (channel 3) in Florence and KPLO-TV (channel 6) in Reliance. KCLO-TV's master control, as well as most internal operations, are housed at KELO-TV's studios on Phillips Avenue in downtown Sioux Falls. KCLO-TV simulcasts KELO-TV's newscasts (with local weather inserts), but airs a separate lineup of syndicated and network programming; there are also separate commercial inserts and legal station identifications.

While KCLO-TV initially carried CBS network programs on an hour delay from KELO-TV when it became a full-power station, it began airing them—and KELO's Sioux Falls–based news—live in January 1991 during the Gulf War and announced it would do so permanently. On August 1, 2026, KCLO—but not KELO—lost its CBS affiliation and became a primary affiliate of The CW.

== History ==
In 1980, Midcontinent Broadcasting filed to build a translator for KELO-TV on channel 15 in Rapid City. At the time, Rapid City was one of the few markets in the country without full service from all three major networks. CBS programming was divided between then-ABC affiliate KOTA-TV and then-NBC affiliate KEVN; the two stations carried up to six hours each of CBS programming each week. Black Hills cable viewers could watch the full CBS schedule on KMGH-TV from Denver. The Federal Communications Commission (FCC) approved the application in November despite protests from KOTA and KEVN; in particular, KOTA feared allowing a KELO-TV translator in the Black Hills would give that station a "monopoly position" in South Dakota television.

The new KELO-TV translator, K15AC, began broadcasting September 26, 1981. Operating at 1,000 watts, it brought CBS programming to viewers within a 35-mile radius of Rapid City. It initially operated with a shoestring staff, with a resident manager based at his home in Rapid City and a single reporter whose stories ran on KELO-TV's Big News. It also did not sell advertising in the Black Hills at the outset. The translator received the signal of KELO-TV satellite KPLO-TV in Reliance–Pierre and beamed it through three microwave sites to Rapid City.

While K15AC displaced KMGH on Rapid City cable systems, it was initially unable to get on cable systems outside the city. According to KELO broadcast operations head Evans Nord, this was because KOTA-TV owner Duhamel Broadcasting Enterprises refused to allow the South Dakota Cable Company, which held the cable franchise for most of the Black Hills region outside Rapid City, to add K15AC; Duhamel was half-owner of South Dakota Cable along with Midcontinent. With this in mind, two years after K15AC began operating, Midcontinent applied for a new full-power license on channel 15, which was granted in January 1987 and took the call letters KBLO-TV that May. It was licensed for 700,000 watts with almost double the coverage area of K15AC. KBLO-TV was planned for local program origination, unlike its sister stations KDLO or KPLO. (The call sign was changed to KCLO-TV in May 1988.) Midcontinent invested $1.7 million to convert the Rapid City operation to full power.

Upon signing on as a full-power station on November 28, 1988, KCLO-TV aired KELO-TV's newscasts on an hour delay, with five-minute local cut-ins at 6 p.m. and 10 p.m. The local cut-ins were discontinued in January 1991 when KCLO-TV began airing all local and network programming live, time-shifted for the Mountain Time Zone. According to station officials, this was initially intended to allow Black Hills viewers to stay abreast of late-breaking coverage of the Gulf War. Due to favorable reception of the shuffled schedule, Midcontinent decided to make the shifted schedule permanent, thus returning to the schedule that had aired in Rapid City between 1981 and 1988.

On January 12, 1996, Midcontinent Media announced that it had sold KELO-TV and its satellites to Young Broadcasting for $50 million. Young assumed control on May 31, 1996. Young Broadcasting merged with Media General in 2013, Media General was in turn acquired by Nexstar Broadcasting Group in a sale announced in January 2016 and completed on January 17, 2017.

KELO-TV along with KDLO-TV and KPLO-TV started a second subchannel, UTV (renamed KELOXTRA in 2021), with the market's UPN affiliation on March 15, 2004. UPN programs had been seen in Sioux Falls on KCPO-LP (channel 26); while it technically increased the coverage area of UPN programming, it made it a digital-only service as opposed to analog KCPO-LP, which limited the number of viewers who could tune in at the time. UTV became the MyNetworkTV affiliate in Sioux Falls in 2006; The CW went to WB affiliate KWSD-TV, owned by Rapid Broadcasting. UTV was not broadcast in Rapid City, where Rapid-owned KKRA-LP was the MyNetworkTV affiliate.

KCLO-TV lost its CBS affiliation to KNBN (channel 21, NewsCenter1) on August 1, 2026, as part of a modified renewal of most other Nexstar affiliations with CBS. At that time, it became a primary CW affiliate. Rapid City was one of two markets where stations owned by Forum Communications Company assumed the CBS affiliation from Nexstar-owned stations in their markets.

== Subchannels ==
KCLO-TV's transmitter is located on Skyline Drive near downtown Rapid City. The station's signal is multiplexed:

Subchannels of KCLO-TV
Subchannel	Res.	Short name	Programming
15.1	1080i	KCLO	The CW
15.2	720p	MCLO	Independent
15.3	480i	ION	Ion
15.4	480i	MYSTERY	Ion Mystery

KCLO-TV's digital configuration has KELOXTRA on channel 15.2, Ion Television on 15.3 and Ion Mystery on 15.4. By 2019, "The Black Hills CW" had been airing in 720p HD over-the-air, per additional distribution of digital bandwidth into channel 15.2 and further compression of the remaining three subchannels of KCLO-TV. On January 1, 2024, "The Black Hills CW" was replaced with a simulcast of "KELOLAND CW" whose operations were provided by KELO-TV and based in Sioux Falls but was aired over all four stations of the KELOLAND Media Group.
