= KRSD-TV =

Television station in Rapid City, South Dakota (1958–1976)

- Rapid City, South Dakota; United States
- Channels: Analog: 7 (VHF)

Programming
- Affiliations: NBC (1958–1970); CBS (1970–1976); ABC (secondary, 1958–1976)

Ownership
- Owner: The Heart of the Black Hills Stations, Inc.

History
- First air date: January 21, 1958
- Last air date: February 29, 1976

Technical information
- ERP: 25.7 kW
- HAAT: 540 ft (165 m)
- Transmitter coordinates: 44°4′17″N 80°22′6.5″W
- Repeater: KDSJ-TV 5 Lead

KRSD-TV (channel 7) was a television station in Rapid City, South Dakota, United States. Its programming was relayed on satellite station KDSJ-TV (channel 5) in Lead. Owned by Heart of the Black Hills Stations, the two stations went on air in 1958 and 1960, respectively. Due to serial deficiencies in the stations' technical operations, the two stations were ordered off the air in 1971 after a decade of proceedings before the Federal Communications Commission. The stations' ownership was able to delay their closure for five more years before finally shutting down in 1976.

== History ==
KRSD-TV began telecasting the evening of January 21, 1958. It was owned by John, Eli, and Henry Daniels and their company, Heart of the Black Hills Stations, along with KRSD (1340 AM) in Rapid City and KDSJ (980 AM) in Deadwood. Channel 7 operated from newly-built radio and television studios located on Mountain View Road in Rapid City. KRSD-TV was the second station on air in Rapid City and was a primary NBC affiliate. With the Rapid City station on the air, Heart of the Black Hills Stations began construction the next year on the satellite station at Lead, which went into service on January 6, 1960. By this time, KRSD-KDSJ was splitting ABC programming with its competitor, KOTA-TV (channel 3). Eli Daniels served as station manager and handled most of the engineering work, while Henry Daniels handled the finances.

=== Signal problems ===
In 1965, the Federal Communications Commission (FCC) adopted new network non-duplication rules for cable systems. These new policies protected local stations from competition by out-of-town imported stations by requiring the local station to be shown over any other station carrying the same programming. The Black Hills Video Corporation cable system in Rapid City had dropped KRSD-TV and resumed carriage of KOA-TV in Denver; it then resumed carrying KRSD-TV in place of KOA-TV on December 31, 1965. Within hours, the system, which served Rapid City and Ellsworth Air Force Base, received 110 calls demanding it reverse the move, and 15 subscribers canceled their service, in what Broadcasting magazine termed an "uprising"; the FCC allowed the cable system to drop KRSD-TV again after an engineer was dispatched from the FCC's field office in Denver and agreed that KRSD-TV's incoming signal was inadequate. The FCC issued a waiver to the non-duplication rule that allowed area cable systems to pipe in out-of-town NBC affiliates until KRSD-TV was able to provide an acceptable signal.

Signal and regulatory problems continued. In September 1966 and October 1967, the FCC issued notices of violation to KRSD-TV and KDSJ-TV; Donald Wyatt, an FCC field engineer from Denver, later testified that of 40 stations he had inspected, they were "the poorest he had found in the entire district". The next year, the commission designated the two stations' license renewals for hearings, seeking to determine if the management was so "negligent, careless, or inept" that it could not be relied upon to serve as a licensee. In March 1969, hearings were held in Rapid City, at which scores of witnesses appeared. The head of the Rapid City chamber of commerce stated that local viewers were disappointed in the performance of the Heart of the Black Hills stations; Eli Daniels said the Associated Press report had mischaracterized his testimony and did not take a stand in favor of or against renewal. In July 1969, an FCC field inspector had deemed the stations' signal unfit for broadcast.

In July 1970, FCC examiner Thomas Donahue recommended a probationary one-year license renewal for KRSD-TV and KDSJ-TV, rather than the standard five-year renewal. Another major change occurred that year: the station exchanged primary network affiliations with KOTA-TV on September 13, switching from NBC to CBS, apparently after KOTA and NBC struck a deal.

The record here demonstrates that The Heart of the Black Hills Stations' operation of stations KRSD-TV and KDSJ-TV was conducted in an exceedingly careless, inept, and negligent manner, and that the licensee is either incapable of correcting or unwilling to correct the operating deficiencies shown by this uncontroverted record.

— FCC decision denying renewal of KRSD-TV and KDSJ-TV's licenses, 1971

The chief of the FCC's Broadcast Bureau, however, objected to the renewal proposal. By the time the full commission heard oral argument in October 1971, three more notices of violation had been issued, one to KRSD-TV and two to KDSJ-TV, on top of the 1966 and 1967 violations and additional notices issued in 1969. The litany of violations accumulated over the stations' time on air, from faulty tower lighting and spurious emissions to poorly kept logs and low-power broadcasts, plus a petition signed by 2,000 Rapid City viewers in 1967, resulted in the FCC finally losing patience with Heart of the Black Hills Stations. The commission voted 5-0 (with two abstentions) to deny the renewals outright and ordered both stations off the air by 12:01 a.m. Mountain Standard Time on December 31, 1971. The FCC found that Heart of the Black Hills had deprived the public of service and thus did not merit renewal.

The final decision noted that KRSD-TV had failed to correct numerous violations dating to 1961, including what were described as some of the worst violations that the commission had ever uncovered. A number of violations detected in 1966 and 1967 had not been corrected by the time of the 1969 inspection. For instance, the Danielses had failed to adequately maintain the lights on the station's transmitting tower, and there were numerous cases of spurious emissions; both violations posed serious air safety hazards. Additionally, the station's signal had deteriorated to the point of unacceptability as early as 1965. It also concluded that the violations had the effect of denying Black Hills viewers access to NBC programming and noted that it had been forced to maintain the waiver allowing cable systems to pipe in out-of-town NBC affiliates due to KRSD-TV's inadequate signal. All of this led the commission to conclude that Heart of the Black Hills Stations was not technically qualified to be a television licensee, finding that it had not fulfilled its requirement to provide "a satisfactory service to the public". In so doing, the commission upbraided Donahue for not fully considering the "serious and adverse impact" that Heart of the Black Hills' technical violations had on the Rapid City viewing public. While the FCC had ordered a handful of radio stations off the air for technical violations, it was the first time that a television station had been denied renewal for technical reasons.

=== Appeals and proposed new stations ===
Heart of the Black Hills Stations—which had sold KRSD radio earlier in the year—immediately announced its plans to appeal. Daniels expressed disappointment that the FCC had not approved an application to improve the stations' facilities. Daniels stated that, if the FCC had allowed it to install a new antenna, it could have raised the funds needed to replace its transmitter. It charged that the station had received letters saying its picture was good, though most in actuality concerned the availability of CBS network fare and of two competing stations in the Rapid City market.

The Danielses made good on their vow to appeal for reconsideration. However, in 1972, the FCC turned the appeal down. It found that those claiming KRSD-TV's picture had improved actually wanted to ensure access to CBS programming and the presence of a second choice for television, alongside KOTA-TV. The commission never intended to delete the channel 7 and channel 5 allocations and thus did not believe the Danielses could be trusted to run them in accordance with FCC rules and the public interest. When the FCC heard the Danielses' claim that the commission's refusal to allow it to buy a new antenna prevented it from raising enough money to improve its facilities, the commissioners concluded that Heart of the Black Hills did not have the financial wherewithal to be a television licensee.

Heart of the Black Hills took the case to federal appeals court, which upheld the decision in February 1973. In the wake of that ruling, a new company, Dakota Broadcasting Company, formed to seek new licenses for channels 7 and 5 and proposed an entirely new operation without using any of the facilities involved in broadcasting KRSD-TV or KDSJ-TV. The commission accepted Dakota's application in late May and set a period for potential other applicants to file. Heart of the Black Hills continued to fight, putting letter cards to mail to Congress in support of KRSD-TV in the Rapid City Journal newspaper.

Two applicants proposed to replace KRSD-TV and KDSJ-TV: Dakota Broadcasting and Western Television, a group with investors from Sturgis and Sioux Falls. Both sought interim operation while the FCC decided the fate of their applications; the two companies had a series of disagreements on technical issues, and the FCC ordered them to craft a joint proposal. The commission proposed to give Western interim authority if it allowed Dakota to join it. While Western hoped to be on the air by the end of the year, Western's plans hit a major snag after the death of Morton Henkin, chairman of its board of directors, in August. That event prompted the National Bank of South Dakota to advise Western that its $650,000 loan agreement would need to be renegotiated, which in turn led Dakota to ask for more financial information from Western. In October, that company's stockholders then withdrew their application.

=== Replacement and shutdown ===
In May 1975, the FCC finally granted Dakota construction permits for new stations on channel 7 in Rapid City and channel 5 in Lead. The Heart of the Black Hills stations were allowed to remain on the air until Dakota could start broadcasting, but their financial difficulties ultimately forced them to make an early exit. On February 18, 1976, the company announced that KRSD-TV and KDSJ-TV would leave the air on February 29, due to increased operational costs. However, Dakota would not be ready to begin broadcasts until July.

Rapid City was left with just one television station for more than four months, causing the local cable company to record a surge in new subscribers. Two-station service was restored when KEVN and KIVV, branded as "Action 7 & 5", began telecasting on July 11, 1976, as primary ABC affiliates. In June 1980, a judge awarded the Associated Press a $1,210 judgment for services rendered to the former KRSD-TV after a breach of contract suit against Heart of the Black Hills Stations seeking payments for the wire service used by KDSJ radio and KRSD-TV.

KOTA and KEVN carried some CBS programming in Rapid City, but the market would not have a full-time CBS affiliate until KELO-TV of Sioux Falls established a translator in Rapid City in 1981. The Rapid City KELO translator and KGGG-FM used KRSD-TV's former tower, which Daniels continued to own. The KDSJ-TV transmitter building burned in a 1981 fire.
