= KEVN-LD =

Television station in Rapid City, South Dakota

- Rapid City, South Dakota; United States
- Channels: Digital: 23 (UHF); Virtual: 7
- Branding: KOTA Territory

Programming
- Affiliations: Fox

Ownership
- Owner: Gray Media; (Gray Television Licensee, LLC)
- Sister stations: KOTA/KHSD/KSGW, KHME

History
- Founded: February 25, 2010
- First air date: February 1, 2016
- Former call signs: K23KK-D (2010–2015); KIVN-LD (2015–2016)
- Call sign meaning: Calls rhyme with channel number seven

Technical information
- Licensing authority: FCC
- Facility ID: 182523
- ERP: 15 kW
- HAAT: 174.6 m (573 ft)
- Transmitter coordinates: 44°4′0″N 103°15′3″W
- Translator(s): KOTA-DT 7.1 (7.3 VHF) Rapid City; KHSD-DT 11.1 (5.4 VHF) Lead; KSGW-DT 12.2 (12.4 VHF) Sheridan, WY; K22OV-D (22 UHF) Caputa

Links
- Public license information: LMS
- Website: www.kotatv.com

KEVN-LD (channel 7) is a low-power television station in Rapid City, South Dakota, United States, affiliated with the Fox network. It is owned by Gray Media alongside ABC affiliate KOTA-TV (channel 3) and MeTV affiliate KHME (channel 23). The stations share studios on Skyline Drive in Rapid City, where KEVN-LD's transmitter is also located.

KEVN-LD is also carried on a subchannel of KOTA-TV, as well as on KOTA's full-power satellites. KHSD-TV (channel 11.2) in Lead, South Dakota, serves the Black Hills proper; it can also be seen over the air in Rapid City. KSGW-TV (channel 12.2) in Sheridan, Wyoming, serves northern and northeast Wyoming. KHSD-TV's transmitter is located on Terry Peak near Spearfish, South Dakota, while KSGW-TV's transmitter is on Bosin Rock.

== History ==
=== KEVN intellectual unit ===
Until 2016, the KEVN call sign, Fox affiliation, and virtual channel 7 assignment were used on the broadcast license presently associated with KOTA-TV. KEVN-TV had launched in 1976 as an ABC affiliate, replacing KRSD-TV, which had signed on in 1958 as an NBC affiliate with a secondary ABC affiliation, switched to CBS in 1970, and was denied license renewal in 1971; KRSD shut down several months before KEVN began operations. KEVN switched to NBC in 1984 and Fox in 1996. The original KEVN was also seen on a satellite station in Lead, KIVV-TV (channel 5), which operated on the license now used by KHSD-TV; virtual channel 5 is presently used by KQME, a satellite of MeTV affiliate KHME (channel 23).

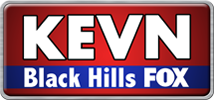
KEVN's first logo, used from 2016 to 2024

=== Current license ===
On September 14, 2015, Gray bought the non-license assets of the market's ABC affiliate KOTA-TV as part of its acquisition of Schurz Communications' television stations. Due to Federal Communications Commission (FCC) ownership restrictions, Gray established this new low-powered station to move the Fox affiliation, KEVN's call sign, virtual channel, and programming. KOTA's ABC affiliation and program streams including its existing PSIP channel 3 numbering was then moved to the old full-powered KEVN, transmitting on RF channel 7. The original KOTA-TV license was then sold to Legacy Broadcasting and became KHME.

At the start of July 2024, the separate "Black Hills Fox" branding was discontinued for KEVN-LD and its simulcasts, and both KOTA and KEVN now feature the "KOTA Territory" branding across both stations vocally, without any mention of their affiliations. KEVN's logo now simply features the Fox logomark replacing that of ABC's, while keeping the black circle the ABC logo usually sits upon for the simplicity of branding both stations.

== Subchannels ==
The station's signal is multiplexed:

Subchannels of KEVN-LD
Channel	Res.	Short name	Programming
7.1	720p	FOX-HD	Fox
3.1	720p	ABC-HD	ABC (KOTA-TV)

Simulcast of subchannels of another station

== News operation ==
KEVN-LD broadcasts 9 1/2 hours of locally produced newscasts each week (with 1 1/2 hours each weekday and one hour each on Saturdays and Sundays). The station carries a 6 p.m. newscast, but does not produce any newscasts during morning or midday timeslots. It rebroadcasts its hour-long 9 p.m. news program at 6 a.m. on weekday mornings.

Early in KEVN's Fox affiliation (on what is now KOTA-TV), the station produced an hour-long morning newscast at 7 a.m. and half-hour newscasts at noon, 5:30 p.m., and 10 p.m.; on weekends, KEVN aired only its late newscast. In 1998, the station moved the late newscast to 9 p.m., making it the first Rapid City station to produce a prime time newscast; Around the same time, the morning and midday newscasts were discontinued. By 2001, KEVN expanded the weeknight 9 p.m. news to an hour; the weekend edition of the newscast was expanded to an hour on November 2, 2013. The station moved the early evening newscast to 6 p.m. on March 31, 2008, and relaunched it as The Six.
