= KNBN =

Television station in Rapid City, South Dakota

- Rapid City, South Dakota; United States
- Channels: Digital: 21 (UHF); Virtual: 21
- Branding: NewsCenter1

Programming
- Affiliations: 21.1: NBC; 21.2: CBS; 21.3: Independent with MyNetworkTV; for others, see § Subchannels

Ownership
- Owner: Forum Communications Company
- Sister stations: KWBH-LD, KSFL-TV, KCWS-LD

History
- Founded: July 15, 1996
- First air date: May 14, 2000
- Former channel numbers: Analog: 21 (UHF, 2000–2009)

Technical information
- Licensing authority: FCC
- Facility ID: 81464
- ERP: 50 kW
- HAAT: 210.8 m (692 ft)
- Transmitter coordinates: 44°5′33″N 103°14′55″W
- Translator(s): see § Translators

Links
- Public license information: Public file; LMS
- Website: www.newscenter1.tv

KNBN (channel 21), branded as NewsCenter1, is a television station in Rapid City, South Dakota, United States, affiliated with NBC and CBS. Owned by Forum Communications Company, the station maintains studios on South Plaza Drive in Rapid City, and its transmitter is located on Cowboy Hill west of downtown.

KNBN came about in the aftermath of an affiliation switch in Rapid City that threatened to leave the market without an NBC affiliate, as KEVN-TV was switched from NBC to Fox. Locally based Rapid Broadcasting, founded by a former owner of KEVN, acquired a low-power Christian TV station and upgraded it to serve as the market's new NBC affiliate beginning July 15, 1996. Newscasts using the NewsCenter1 name debuted on September 22, 1997. KNBN moved signals twice in its early years, first to a new low-power TV station and then to high-power channel 21 in May 2000. Forum acquired KNBN in 2024, and the station assumed the CBS affiliation for western South Dakota in August 2026. The station produces local newscasts for western South Dakota.

== History ==
In March 1996, KEVN-TV's owner, Blackstar, announced plans to affiliate the incumbent NBC outlet for the Rapid City area with the Fox network; Fox held an equity stake in Blackstar. This presented the possibility that Rapid City would be left without an NBC affiliate. Locally based Rapid Broadcasting, whose president Gilbert Moyle had been a part-owner of KEVN from 1973 to 1985, bought low-power TV station K24AM, a primarily Christian outlet which had broadcast since the mid-1980s, and increased its transmitter power. It also obtained the NBC affiliation for Rapid City for the low-power outlet, all with a month to go. KNBN-LP (channel 24, later KKRA-LP) officially launched July 15, the date that KEVN switched to Fox, and immediately appeared on local cable systems (including channel 10 in Rapid City).

KNBN launched without a local news presence. In December 1996, it began producing news cut-ins during Today. A full news service debuted September 22, 1997, as NewsCenter1, airing at 6 and 10 p.m. nightly; the early evening time slot contrasted with KOTA and KEVN, who presented their main news at 5:30. By the time that newscast had debuted, KNBN-LP—call sign and programming—had moved from the channel 24 station to channel 27 in Rapid City with a translator on channel 31 in Lead; the next year, KKRA became an affiliate of Pax TV. The channel 27 and 31 construction permits had been held by the Plaza Boulevard Wesleyan Church. Rapid's relationship with Pax expanded with the 2000 debut of KAUN (channel 36, now KSFL-TV) in Sioux Falls.

Rapid Broadcasting had been one of 11 applicants seeking to obtain a full-power license on channel 21. The passage of the Telecommunications Act of 1996 and Balanced Budget Act of 1997 forced the Federal Communications Commission (FCC) to scrap the comparative hearing process and led to the auction of the assignment in September 1999. Rapid made the winning bid, holding off four other hopefuls, notably including Sunbelt Communications Company. KNBN began broadcasting at full power on channel 21 in May 2000. By November 2001, the station's news ratings had pulled nearly even with KOTA-TV. Beginning in 2002, it produced a 9 p.m. CT (8 p.m. MT) newscast of Sioux Falls–area news for that city's commonly owned KAUN. Moyle died in 2006.

On January 12, 2009, KNBN flash-cut its analog signal to digital, in time to provide a high-definition broadcast of Super Bowl XLIII. The digital signal was used to carry the related low-power TV stations KWBH-LP and KKRA-LP, by then affiliates of The CW and MyNetworkTV, in digital format.

=== Forum ownership ===
On August 14, 2024, it was announced KNBN and KWBH-LD would be sold to Fargo, North Dakota–based Forum Communications Company. Forum had the year before acquired KSFL-TV in Sioux Falls. The sale was completed on October 2. Bill Marcil Jr., president of Forum Communications, described KNBN as the company's "missing puzzle piece" for total broadcast coverage of the Dakotas.

A subchannel of KNBN assumed the CBS affiliation for western and central North Dakota from KCLO-TV (channel 15) on August 1, 2026. KNBN was one of two Forum-owned stations receiving CBS from Nexstar Media Group–owned stations in their markets.

== Technical information ==
=== Subchannels ===
KNBN broadcasts from a transmitter site on Cowboy Hill west of downtown Rapid City. Its signal is multiplexed:

Subchannels of KNBN
| Subchannel | Res. | Short name | Programming |
|---|---|---|---|
| 21.1 | 1080i | KNBNNBC | NBC |
| 21.2 | 720p | KNBNCBS | CBS |
| 21.3 | 480i | MNBN | Independent with MyNetworkTV |
| 21.4 | 480i | YTA | YTA TV |

=== Translators ===
KNBN is rebroadcast by two low-power TV stations in Rapid City and two translators:

- Gillette, Wyoming: K22AD-D
- Lead: K35MW-D
- Rapid City: KKRA-LD 25.x and KWBH-LD 27.x

== See also ==
- Channel 1 branded TV stations in the United States
- Channel 21 digital TV stations in the United States
- Channel 21 virtual TV stations in the United States
