= Caputa, South Dakota =

Caputa
- Unincorporated community
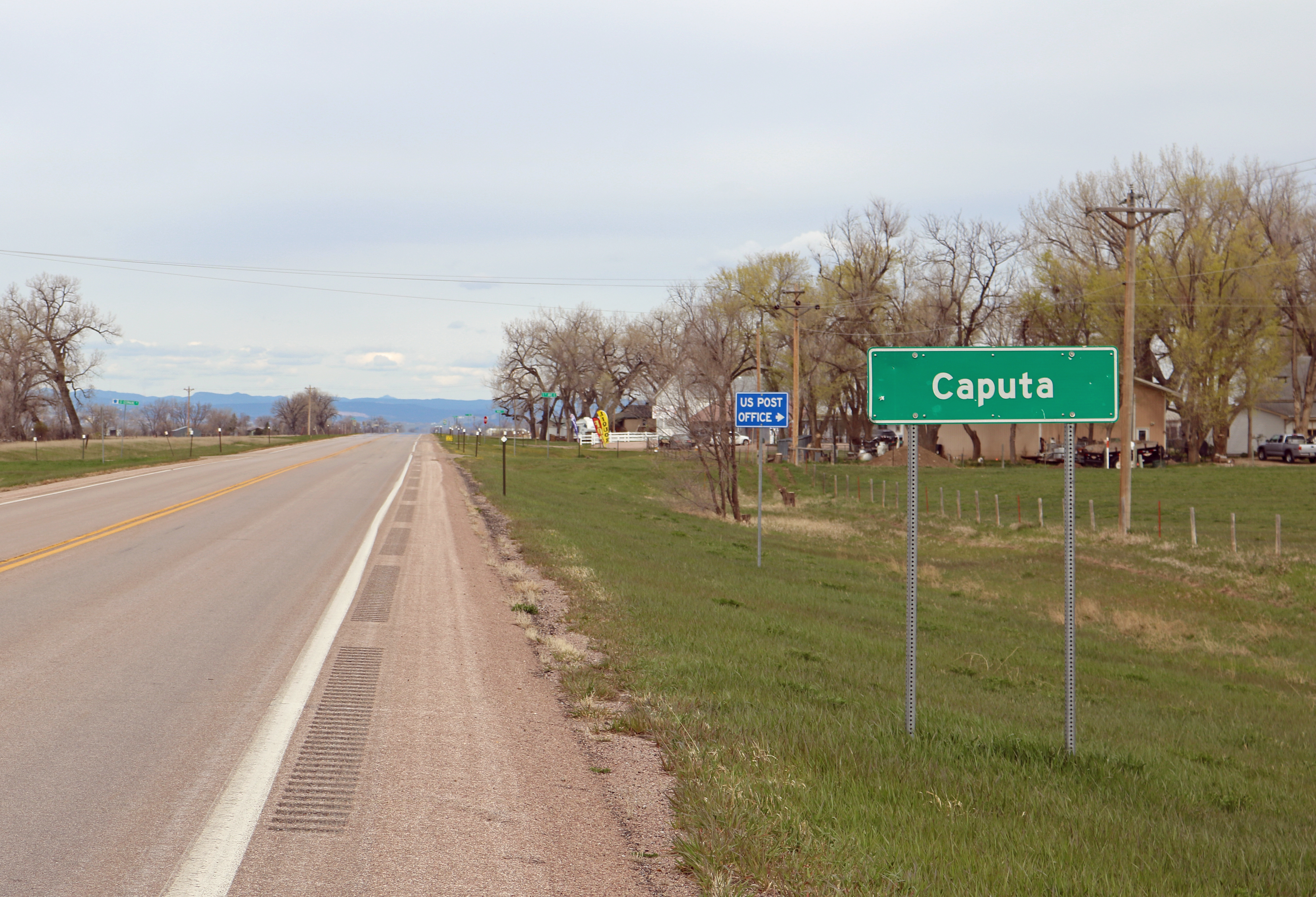
- Caputa, looking north on highway 44.

- Location within the state of South Dakota Caputa (the United States)
- Coordinates: 43°59′46″N 102°59′04″W
- Country: United States
- State: South Dakota
- County: Pennington

Area
  - Total: 1.01 sq mi (2.62 km^{2})
- Elevation: 2,917 ft (889 m)

Population (2020)
  - Total: 32
- Time zone: UTC-6 (Central (CST))
  - Summer (DST): UTC-5 (CDT)
- ZIP codes: 57725
- GNIS feature ID: 2628841

Caputa is an unincorporated community and census-designated place (CDP) in Pennington County, South Dakota, United States. The population was 32 at the 2020 census.

Caputa got its start in 1907 when the Milwaukee Railroad was extended to that point.
