= KELO-TV =

Television station in Sioux Falls, South Dakota

- Sioux Falls, South Dakota; United States
- Channels: Digital: 11 (VHF); Virtual: 11
- Branding: KELOLAND Media Group; KELOLAND News; KELOXTRA (11.2); KELOLAND CW (11.4)

Programming
- Affiliations: 11.1: CBS; 11.2: Independent with MyNetworkTV; 11.3: Ion; 11.4: The CW

Ownership
- Owner: Nexstar Media Group; (Nexstar Media Inc.)
- Sister stations: KCLO-TV

History
- First air date: May 20, 1953
- Former channel numbers: Analog: 11 (VHF, 1953–2009); Digital: 32 (UHF, 2004–2009)
- Former affiliations: NBC (primary 1953–1958, secondary 1958–1960); DuMont (secondary, 1953–1955); ABC (secondary, 1953–1967)
- Call sign meaning: taken from former sister station KELO radio

Technical information
- Licensing authority: FCC
- Facility ID: 41983
- ERP: 30 kW
- HAAT: 610 m (2,001 ft)
- Transmitter coordinates: 43°31′7″N 96°32′5.7″W
- Repeater: see § Rebroadcasters

Links
- Public license information: Public file; LMS
- Website: www.keloland.com

KELO-TV (channel 11) is a television station in Sioux Falls, South Dakota, United States, affiliated with CBS, MyNetworkTV, and The CW. The station is owned by Nexstar Media Group, and maintains studios on Phillips Avenue in downtown Sioux Falls; its transmitter is located near Rowena, South Dakota.

KELO-TV's programming is simulcast on two full-power semi-satellites—KDLO-TV in Florence (channel 3, serving Watertown) and KPLO-TV in Reliance (channel 6, serving Pierre). The combined footprint of the three stations covers eastern South Dakota, southwestern Minnesota, and northwestern Iowa, an area the station calls "KELOLAND" (/ˈkɛloʊˌlænd/). KELO-TV also operates KCLO-TV in Rapid City (channel 15), the CW affiliate for western South Dakota and the Black Hills, as part of the KELOLAND Media Group.

KELO-TV was the first television station in South Dakota, beginning broadcasting in May 1953, and was built by Midcontinent Broadcasting as an extension of KELO (1320 AM). Originally a primary affiliate of NBC, it switched to CBS in 1957. KDLO-TV and KPLO-TV were built in the mid-1950s, expanding the station's geographic reach, while an expansion to Rapid City took place in 1981. Young Broadcasting acquired the KELO television stations in 1996. Mergers and acquisitions in the 2010s resulted in ownership passing from Young to Media General to Nexstar. In 2026, KCLO-TV lost its CBS affiliation and became a primary affiliate of The CW, though it continued to carry news and other programs from Sioux Falls.

In the Sioux Falls media market—including central and eastern South Dakota—KELO-TV has long been the dominant television station in ratings and local news coverage, often commanding more viewers than the other stations in the market combined.

== History ==
=== Midcontinent ownership ===
In May 1950, Midcontinent Broadcasting, owner of KELO (1320 AM), filed the first application to the Federal Communications Commission (FCC) for a television station in South Dakota. The application would not be considered for several years, as the FCC was in the midst of a four-year freeze on the grant of new TV station applications, but Midcontinent Broadcasting faced no opposition when the freeze was lifted in April 1952. By then, Walworth Theatres of Minneapolis had bought Midcontinent Broadcasting. When the construction permit was granted on November 20, 1952, company president Joe Floyd said that he intended for the station to be on the air sometime after the start of 1953. Construction proceeded quickly, though a change in the antenna specified required a different type of tower than was originally specified. Renovations were made to the existing KELO radio studios at 8th Street and Phillips Avenue, which had been planned for future television use.

KELO-TV put out South Dakota's first test pattern on May 19, 1953; regular programming began the following day. It carried programs from all four networks of the day—NBC, CBS, ABC, and DuMont. However, it was a primary NBC affiliate, mirroring its radio sister. It operated from a 575 ft (175 m) tower near Shindler, south of Sioux Falls. There were no local studio programs at the outset because cameras were too expensive; all programs were on film. It was two years before the station had its own cameras. Power was increased in 1954, extending service to many rural areas outside of Sioux Falls. Also in 1954, Midcontinent set up a coaxial cable link from Omaha to receive live network programming via microwave. Floyd became nationally recognized for his advertising in trade publications, designed to help KELO radio and television court sponsors and their programs: the ads featured Floyd smoking a cigar with the tagline, "I'm Joe Floyd. I consider myself a helluva salesman." The ads were recognizable enough that mention of them was made in Broadcasting magazine's obituary upon his death in 1992.

Station management, including Floyd, recognized early on that KELO-TV needed to expand its audience beyond Sioux Falls to be viable. With this in mind, in late 1954, Midcontinent began applying for additional full-power stations as part of a strategy to make KELO-TV a regional station. In December 1954, it applied to build KDLO-TV at Florence to serve Watertown, Aberdeen, and Huron; that station began broadcasting on September 28, 1955, from studios in Garden City. This occurred even though KELO-TV had lost its original tower in a suspected tornado. The station erected a temporary tower within 48 hours in time to air the 1955 World Series; the temporary facility was still operating at the time KDLO came online. A new, 1,032-foot (315 m) tower was completed in 1956; at the time, it was the tallest structure in South Dakota.

In April 1956, Midcontinent filed for a KELO-TV satellite in central South Dakota. It sought to move channel 6 from Pierre to Reliance. Midcontinent fronted half of the cost for a tower and transmitter, with residents of Pierre, Winner, and Chamberlain raising money for the other half. Other stations in the area made bids, but Floyd was able to win residents over by driving from a broadcasting convention in Chicago to a meeting in Kennebec; his competitors stayed in Chicago. The construction permit was approved in December 1956, and KPLO-TV began broadcasting on July 12, 1957. Around this time, the station began calling its coverage area "KELO-Land".

The additions of KDLO and KPLO expanded KELO's coverage area and vaulted Sioux Falls into the top 100 media markets in the United States, making the "KELO-Land" stations highly profitable. The stations' footprint perfectly matched the flow of goods through South Dakota, which centered on Sioux Falls, boosting advertising revenues. Midcontinent attempted to replicate the formula with WKOW-TV in Madison, Wisconsin, but did not have much success since Madison was not the state's primary merchandising hub. The semi-satellites gave KELO-TV a coverage advantage that persisted for decades. For most of the analog broadcasting era, it was the only station that could be seen over-the-air in some form throughout the market. In contrast, as late as 2019, a third of the market—some 200,000 viewers—could not receive both KSFY-TV and KDLT-TV over-the-air.

The Florence and Reliance semi-satellites brought growing audiences to KELO-TV's local programming. In 1955, Midcontinent sent Dave Dedrick to the other station it owned at the time, WMIN-TV in Minneapolis. That station, also on channel 11, had a children's show titled Captain 11. Dedrick, who also served as a weatherman for KELO, shadowed the children's host in Minneapolis, then returned to Sioux Falls to start his own version of Captain 11. KELO-TV's version ran for 41 years, enduring decades of changes in children's television and Dedrick's own struggles with alcoholism, before his retirement in December 1996, culminating a 52-year involvement with KELO radio and television. One local program was shared between KELO-TV and stations in Sioux City, Iowa. KELO-TV co-produced The Big Bowl, a bowling program in which Sioux Falls contestants faced off against Sioux City contestants, co-produced by Sioux City's KVTV/KCAU-TV. After a year of dormancy, KELO partnered with fellow CBS affiliate KMEG to revive it as Star Bowling.

KELO radio and television switched their primary affiliations to CBS beginning in September 1957, though they remained NBC primary affiliates through June 1958 and KELO-TV continued to provide programs from all networks. CBS had made a good offer at the same time that NBC denied Floyd an increase in network compensation fees for carrying its programming, fees that Floyd felt justified based on the station's performance. New studios were built at 13th and Phillips streets in 1959.

The station received its first competition when KSOO-TV (channel 13, now KSFY-TV) began in July 1960 and took over the NBC affiliation. A full-time ABC affiliate was not broadcast in the region until 1967, when KCAU-TV in Sioux City switched from CBS. It did so in part because KELO-TV was building a 2,000-foot (610 m) broadcast tower at Rowena in collaboration with KSOO-TV. The Sioux City station advertised in the Argus Leader in Sioux Falls, staking a claim to be the ABC affiliate for both Sioux City and Sioux Falls. An in-market ABC affiliate would not arrive until 1969, when KORN-TV in Mitchell switched from NBC and moved its transmitter closer to Sioux Falls. Local programs were telecast in color from KELO-TV for the first time in September 1968.

On June 24, 1968, a North Central Airlines airplane clipped a guy wire on the KELO–KSOO tower less than a year after it came into service. While the aircraft landed safely on one engine, the tower collapsed. KELO-TV reverted to its former site near Shindler for 11 months while the Rowena tower was rebuilt; litigation promoted by Midcontinent against North Central Airlines related to damages from the reduced coverage area stretched into January 1975. That month, on January 11, the rebuilt mast toppled again, this time in an ice storm. While KELO-TV temporarily relocated to the Shindler site, KSFY-TV had no backup facility. With channel 13 itself suddenly unable to air Super Bowl IX, arrangements were made for KELO to air the contest instead. Again, KELO-TV broadcast from the Shindler tower until December, when a replacement was put into service. Ice storms have since felled other towers used by KELO-TV's satellites; KDLO-TV lost its tower in 1977 and again in December 2022, while KPLO-TV lost its tower on Medicine Butte in 2010 and did not broadcast for two months.

Midcontinent had first received and surrendered a permit for a Rapid City television station in 1954 and then obtained an option on a transmitter site in Rapid City in 1962. KELO-TV did not expand to western South Dakota until September 1981, when it launched KPLO-TV translator K15AC. This returned CBS programming to the Black Hills; the last full-time CBS affiliate in that market had been KRSD-TV, which closed in February 1976. K15AC was upgraded to a full-power station as KCLO-TV in November 1988. KCLO-TV initially aired programming on an hour delay from KELO in order to timeshift it for the Mountain Time Zone, unlike the translator, but this practice was abandoned permanently in January 1991 amid the Gulf War.

=== Young Broadcasting ownership ===
On January 12, 1996, Midcontinent Media announced that it had sold KELO-TV and its satellites to Young Broadcasting for $50 million. Young assumed control on May 31, 1996. A week earlier, Young announced 13 staffers would be laid off, stating that KELO-TV was overstaffed for a station in such a small market. (Note: Midcontinent would retain the KELO radio stations until 2004.) In 1999, the station was given the National Association of Broadcasters Friend in Need Television Award for outstanding service in the face of natural disasters after helping lead efforts to rebuild tornado-ravaged Spencer, South Dakota.

KELO-TV along with KDLO-TV and KPLO-TV started a second subchannel, UTV (renamed KELOXTRA in 2021), with the market's UPN affiliation on March 15, 2004. UPN programs had been seen in Sioux Falls on KCPO-LP (channel 26); while the change technically increased the coverage area of UPN programming, it made it a digital-only service as opposed to analog KCPO-LP. This limited the number of viewers who could tune in at the time, as not everyone had digital-capable TVs in 2004. UTV became the MyNetworkTV affiliate in Sioux Falls in 2006; The CW went to WB affiliate KWSD-TV, owned by Rapid Broadcasting. UTV is not broadcast in Rapid City; in that market, the MyNetworkTV affiliation went to Rapid-owned KKRA-LP when the network launched in 2006.

=== Media General and Nexstar ownership ===
On June 6, 2013, Young Broadcasting announced that it would merge with Media General. The merger was approved by the FCC on November 8, after Media General shareholders approved the merger a day earlier; it was completed on November 12. Media General was in turn acquired by Nexstar Broadcasting Group in a sale announced in January 2016 and completed on January 17, 2017.

Prior to the 2026 season, KELO announced an agreement to broadcast two South Dakota State Jackrabbit football games in simulcast with Midco Sports.

== News operation ==
KELO-TV is the perennial local news leader in Sioux Falls, often attracting more viewers than KSFY and KDLT combined. When ruling on a merger of KSFY and KDLT, the FCC found that KELO had the majority of advertising revenue and substantial majority of news viewers in the market. The combined footprint of the KELOLAND stations covered 80 percent of the state even before the expansion to Rapid City. For many years, it considered the Argus Leader newspaper, not the other local stations, as its main competition.

The first local newscasts on KELO-TV—before the station had its own cameras—were produced with a method Floyd called "live film". The evening news was filmed in the afternoon, developed, and then played back at the transmitter site. A simulated phone call created an opening for a live announcer on site to insert the current weather information into the newscast. The news department expanded over time. In addition to its 6 and 10 p.m. evening newscasts, KELO added its first morning news, the half-hour Good Morning KELO-Land, in 1977. The Early News, the station's first 5 p.m. local newscast, debuted in 1982; it would be another 40 years before the station added a newscast at 4 p.m. in 2022.

The station was the first in the market to switch from film to electronic news gathering, doing so in 1973, six years before the other stations in the market. It was also the first in the market to present closed captioning in local newscasts in 1991, and it followed close behind KSFY-TV in obtaining a satellite newsgathering truck (in 1988) and in producing its local newscasts in high definition (in 2011).

KELO-TV also had considerable stability in news personalities for a market the size of Sioux Falls. Steve Hemmingsen co-anchored the station's local news from 1975 to 2000, estimating he presented some 18,000 newscasts. He went into semi-retirement in 2000, hosting a monthly interview show and contributing to other projects. For much of that time, he was teamed with Doug Lund, who served for 32 years from 1974 to 2006. Jim Burt, who had begun sports play-by-play at KELO radio in 1948 and crossed over to television when channel 11 went on the air, was the last remaining original employee of channel 11 when he retired in 1987.

KELO began the deployment of regional Doppler weather radar units in 1997, with two sites in Huron and Beresford. A third radar at Wall was installed in 2001.

== Technical information ==
=== Rebroadcasters ===
KELO-TV rebroadcasts programming over three full-power stations. Two of them, KDLO-TV and KPLO-TV, are semi-satellites of the main KELO-TV signal, airing separate commercials. The third, KCLO-TV, was a semi-satellite for Rapid City before CBS moved its affiliation to KNBN 21.2 on August 1, 2026, at which time it began airing KELO–CW instead.

KDLO and KPLO each operate a translator to extend their coverage. The KPLO facility is a digital replacement translator, added to restore coverage lost after the digital transition.

Semi-satellites of KELO-TV
Station	City of license	Channel; VC (RF)	Facility ID	ERP	HAAT	Transmitter coordinates	First air date	Public license information
KCLO-TV (Note: Primary affiliate of The CW, simulcasting KELO 11.4.)	Rapid City	15 (16)	41969	150 kW	154 m (505 ft)	44°4′13″N 103°15′3″W	November 28, 1988	Public file; LMS
KDLO-TV	Florence	3 (3)	41975	14.4 kW	513.3 m (1,684 ft)	44°57′56.2″N 97°35′23.3″W	September 28, 1955	Public file; LMS
KPLO-TV	Reliance	6 (13)	41964	46.9 kW	306.3 m (1,005 ft)	43°57′56.7″N 99°36′12″W	July 12, 1957	Public file; LMS

==== Translators of KDLO-TV and KPLO-TV ====
- K24DT-D Aberdeen (translates KDLO-TV)
- KPLO-TV (DRT) Pierre (translates KPLO-TV)

=== Subchannels ===
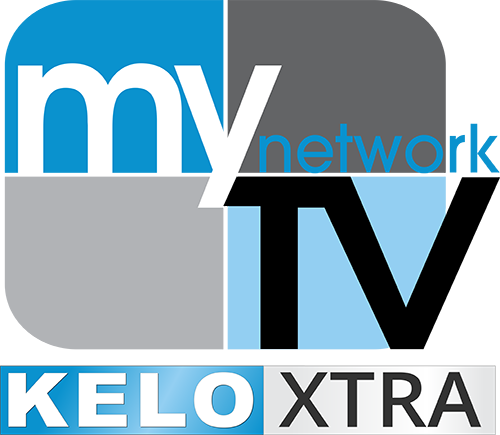
Logo for KELOXTRA

Logo for KELOLAND CW

The stations' signals are multiplexed:

Subchannels of KELO-TV, KDLO-TV, and KPLO-TV
Subchannel			Res.	Short name			Programming
KELO-TV	KDLO-TV	KPLO-TV	Res.	KELO-TV	KDLO-TV	KPLO-TV	Programming
11.1	3.1	6.1	1080i	KELO	KDLO	KPLO	CBS
11.2	3.2	6.2	720p	UTV			Independent with MyNetworkTV
11.3	N/A		480i	ION	N/A		Ion
11.4	3.4	6.4	720p	KELOCW	KDLOCW	KPLOCW	The CW

=== Analog-to-digital conversion ===
KELO-TV began broadcasting its digital signal on March 6, 2003. This followed work at Rowena to prepare the tower to broadcast digital service for KELO-TV and KSFY-TV. KELO-TV shut down its analog signal, over VHF channel 11, on June 12, 2009, the official date on which full-power television stations in the United States transitioned from analog to digital broadcasts under federal mandate. The station's digital signal relocated from its pre-transition UHF channel 32 to VHF channel 11 for post-transition operations. KDLO-TV and KPLO-TV did not provide digital service until the transition date.
