= KWBH-LD =

Television station in Rapid City, South Dakota

Translator of KNBN, Rapid City, South Dakota
- Rapid City, South Dakota; United States
- Channels: Digital: 27 (UHF); Virtual: 27
- Branding: see KNBN infobox

Programming
- Affiliations: 27.1: NBC; 27.2: CBS; 27.3: Independent with MyNetworkTV; for others, see § Subchannels

Ownership
- Owner: Forum Communications Company

History
- Founded: July 7, 1992
- First air date: April 2, 1998
- Former call signs: K27ED (1992−1997); KNBN-LP (1997–2003); KWBH-LP (2003–2022)
- Former channel numbers: Analog: 27 (UHF, 1998–2022)
- Former affiliations: NBC (1998–2003); The WB (2003–2006); The CW (2006–2017); MyNetworkTV ([primary, 2017–March 2021; 27.2, December 2021–2026, now on LD3); Silent (March–December 2021)
- Call sign meaning: "WB Black Hills" (reflecting previous affiliation)

Technical information
- Licensing authority: FCC
- Facility ID: 66654
- Class: LD
- ERP: 2.6 kW
- HAAT: 126.7 m (416 ft)
- Transmitter coordinates: 44°5′33″N 103°14′55″W

Links
- Public license information: LMS
- Website: www.newscenter1.tv

KWBH-LD (channel 27) is a low-power television station in Rapid City, South Dakota, United States. It is a translator of dual NBC/CBS affiliate KNBN (channel 21) which is owned by Forum Communications Company. KWBH-LD's transmitter is located on Cowboy Hill west of downtown; its parent station maintains studios on South Plaza Drive in Rapid City.

== History ==
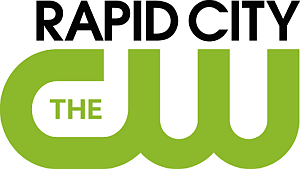
KWBH's former CW logo (2006–2017)

The station signed on for the first time on April 2, 1998, as an NBC affiliate on analog channel 27 with the call letters KNBN-LP. In 2000, Rapid Broadcasting began airing NBC programming on full-power KNBN (channel 21). In October 2003, channel 27—renamed KWBH-LP—became a WB affiliate and carried programming from The CW Plus' predecessor, The WB 100+ Station Group. In September 2006, UPN and The WB merged to become The CW. KWBH-LP joined the new network upon its launch. In 2017, KWBH-LP switched to MyNetworkTV after losing The CW to a subchannel of CBS affiliate KCLO-TV (channel 15).

KWBH-LP went silent in March 2021, ahead of the FCC-mandated shutdown of analog LPTV stations on July 13. Its programming was carried in high definition on KNBN's second digital subchannel. KWBH-LP filed a digital license to cover application on December 16, 2021, indicating that it would rebroadcast KNBN. The station was licensed for digital operation effective February 4, 2022, changing its call sign to KWBH-LD.

On August 14, 2024, it was announced KWBH-LD (and KNBN) would be sold to Fargo, North Dakota–based Forum Communications Company, which owns former sister station KSFL-TV in Sioux Falls. The sale was completed on October 2.

== Subchannels ==
Subchannels of KNBN
| Channel | Res. | Short name | Programming |
|---|---|---|---|
| 21.1 | 1080i | KNBNNBC | NBC |
| 21.2 | 720p | KNBNCBS | CBS |
| 21.3 | 480i | MNBN | Independent with MyNetworkTV |
| 21.4 | 480i | YTA | YTA TV |
