= KSFL-TV =

Television station in Sioux Falls, South Dakota

- Sioux Falls, South Dakota; United States
- Channels: Digital: 36 (UHF); Virtual: 36
- Branding: Sioux Falls Live

Programming
- Affiliations: 36.1: Ion Television; 36.2: YTA TV; 36.3: Jewelry TV

Ownership
- Owner: Forum Communications Company
- Sister stations: KCWS-LD

History
- Founded: April 11, 1997
- First air date: November 8, 2000
- Former call signs: KAUN (1997–2003); KWSD (2003–2023)
- Former channel numbers: Analog: 36 (UHF, 2000–2009); Digital: 51 (UHF, 2002–2009)
- Former affiliations: Pax TV/Ion (2000–2003, 2023); The WB (2003–2006); The CW (2006–2012); MeTV (2012–2015); Retro TV (2015–2020); Independent (2020−2021, 2023–2025); YTA TV (2021–2023, now on 36.2)
- Call sign meaning: The station's planned news operation and website is known as "Sioux Falls Live"

Technical information
- Licensing authority: FCC
- Facility ID: 29121
- ERP: 36.9 kW
- HAAT: 229.7 m (754 ft)
- Transmitter coordinates: 43°30′14″N 96°34′18.8″W

Links
- Public license information: Public file; LMS
- Website: siouxfallslive.com

KSFL-TV (channel 36), branded as Sioux Falls Live, is a television station in Sioux Falls, South Dakota, United States, affiliated with Ion Television. It is owned by Forum Communications Company alongside low-power station KCWS-LD (channel 27). KSFL-TV's studios are located on Phillips Avenue in downtown Sioux Falls, and its transmitter is located in Rowena. In addition to television, Sioux Falls Live is a digital news site covering the Sioux Falls area.

This station began broadcasting in November 2000 as KAUN, an affiliate of Pax TV. Known as Pax 18, it was operated as a joint venture of Midcontinent Communications and an affiliate of Rapid Broadcasting, the owner of KNBN in Rapid City. Pax 18 was available statewide on cable and aired a 9 p.m. newscast for the Sioux Falls area originating from Rapid City and South Dakota high school state championships. In 2003, the station changed affiliations to The WB as KWSD, successively airing The WB, The CW (2006–2012), MeTV (2012–2015), and other networks.

Forum acquired KWSD in 2023 and relaunched the station as KSFL-TV, alongside the launch of the online news website Sioux Falls Live. It aired Forum News Network, a regional news program produced in Fargo, North Dakota, and covering Forum's entire print, broadcast and digital news region in the Upper Midwest. Forum declared its intention to produce local news programming when it bought the station and began airing a Sioux Falls–based 9 p.m. newscast on September 7, 2026.

== History ==
=== Rapid Broadcasting ownership ===
The Iowa Teleproduction Center obtained a construction permit for channel 36 in Sioux Falls under the call sign KAUN. It sold the permit to Midwest Broadcasting Company of Rapid City in a deal filed in November 1997. By 1998, Midwest was constructing a tower near Rowena in preparation for a planned 1999 sign-on as the local affiliate of Pax TV. The station was on the air by December 2000, airing Pax programming as well as high school sports. Midwest was related to Rapid Broadcasting, owner of KNBN (NewsCenter 1), the NBC affiliate in Rapid City, which had started a Pax station there in 1998. The station was known as Pax 18, after its cable channel. Operations were carried out by a joint venture of Midcontinent Communications and KNBN. Midco carried the channel statewide. Rapid won the rights to South Dakota high school sports championships in 2001, giving the station a sports presence in an area long dominated by KELO-TV. On January 28, 2002, KAUN started a local news operation in Sioux Falls to present the first 9 p.m. news program in the market. It was anchored by Ben Boyett, previously of KDLT-TV, from KNBN in Rapid City. When NewsCenter 1 at 9 went off the air, the Sioux Falls market did not have another local newscast in the time period until 2020.

In October 2003, Rapid Broadcasting affiliated with The WB in Rapid City and Sioux Falls, with channel 36 changing its call sign to KWSD. When The WB and UPN merged in 2006 to form The CW, KWSD became the CW affiliate for Sioux Falls. KWSD's CW affiliation ended on September 10, 2012; at that time, the affiliation moved to a subchannel of KSFY-TV, and KWSD switched its affiliation to MeTV on that date. That network also moved to KSFY in September 2015.

=== Forum ownership ===
On November 23, 2022, it was reported that Fargo, North Dakota–based Forum Communications Company would purchase KWSD and sister station KCWS-LD from Jim Simpson, then-owner of KNBN and KWBH-LD in Rapid City, for $1.4 million; the sale was completed on February 21, 2023. Forum, which owned newspapers in the area and a commercial printing facility in Sioux Falls, intended to create a third television news operation in the Sioux Falls market. At the time, the station was airing YTA TV.

On February 24, 2023, the station changed its call sign to KSFL-TV; several weeks later, it switched its affiliation to Ion Television. It dropped Ion on January 1, 2024. At that time, Forum began broadcasting Forum News Network, its 9 p.m. newscast produced in Fargo, North Dakota, in Sioux Falls and streaming the program on its digital newspaper websites. The regional program covers Forum's newspaper, broadcast, and digital footprint. Later that year, Forum bought Simpson's remaining stations, including KNBN.

On September 7, 2026, KSFL-TV began producing its own local 9 p.m. weeknight newscast from downtown Sioux Falls.

== Technical information ==
=== Subchannels ===
KSFL-TV is broadcast from a transmitter facility in Rowena, South Dakota. The station's signal is multiplexed:

Subchannels of KSFL-TV
Subchannel	Res.	Short name	Programming
36.1	720p	KSFL-DT	Ion Television
36.2	720p	YTA	YTA TV
36.3	480i	JTV	Jewelry TV

=== Analog-to-digital conversion ===
KSFL-TV (as KWSD) shut down its analog signal, over UHF channel 36, on June 12, 2009, the official date on which full-power television stations in the United States transitioned from analog to digital broadcasts under federal mandate. The station's digital signal relocated from its pre-transition UHF channel 51 to channel 36 for post-transition operations.
