= KCPO-LD =

Television station in Sioux Falls, South Dakota

- Sioux Falls, South Dakota; United States
- Channels: Digital: 26 (UHF); Virtual: 26
- Branding: KCPO (localized); Central Plains Media (regional)

Programming
- Affiliations: 26.1: Independent; 26.2: Retro TV; 26.3: One America Plus

Ownership
- Owner: Central Plains Media; (G.I.G., Inc.)

History
- Founded: March 25, 1992
- First air date: March 12, 1999
- Former call signs: K07UP (1992–1998); KCPO-LP (1998–2020)
- Former channel numbers: Analog: 26 (UHF, 1999–2020)
- Former affiliations: UPN (1999–2004); Bloomberg (secondary, 1999–2002)
- Call sign meaning: Chuck Poppen (station owner)

Technical information
- Licensing authority: FCC
- Facility ID: 26041
- ERP: 2.79 kW
- HAAT: 59.1 m (194 ft)
- Transmitter coordinates: 43°31′56″N 96°44′21″W

Links
- Public license information: LMS
- Website: www.kcpo.tv

KCPO-LD (channel 26) is a low-power independent television station in Sioux Falls, South Dakota, United States, owned by Chuck Poppen's Central Plains Media. Its transmitter is located on the campus of the University of Sioux Falls.

== History ==
KCPO-LP signed on the air for the first time on March 12, 1999, as a UPN and Bloomberg affiliate for the Sioux Falls market. In 2004, KCPO-LP launched a semi-satellite with the call sign KCPL-LP (channel 52) in Rapid City.

KCPO was affiliated with UPN until CBS affiliate KELO-TV (channel 11) launched its UPN-affiliated "UTV" digital subchannel in January 2004. KCPL was affiliated with UPN until the network stopped operations in 2006, while simulcasting KCPO outside of network programming. After 2006, KCPL operated as an independent station fully simulcasting KCPO.

A third sister station, KCPM (channel 27), located in Grand Forks, North Dakota, was affiliated with MyNetworkTV, and was also a former UPN affiliate since its launch in 2003. It simulcast much of KCPO's programming when not airing network material, but aired separate commercials, station identifications and sometimes different syndicated programming due to Federal Communications Commission (FCC) market regulations. KCPM's license was canceled on March 9, 2020, for failure to transmit from authorized facilities for the past 12 months.

KCPL-LP's license was canceled by the FCC on March 12, 2013, while KCPO-LP was briefly off the air and its license was planned to be canceled on March 12, 2014, but was renewed.

== Programming ==
KCPO aired syndicated television programs, movies and locally produced programming, including a country music video program called That Country Video Show and a motorsports program called Talk'n Dirt featuring coverage of area race tracks and events. Both of these programs could be seen on KCPO and KCPM.

The uniqueness of this three-station system was it was the only South Dakota station group that broadcast/cablecast in South and North Dakota and Minnesota. Agreements with other broadcast stations have provided sports programming allowing viewers to see coverage of such activities as the KSTC broadcasts of Minnesota State High School League football, hockey, and basketball tournaments. These tournaments have been regularly carried on the Central Plains Media stations for many years.

== Technical information ==
=== Subchannels ===
The station's signal is multiplexed:

Subchannels of KCPO-LD
Channel	Res.	Short name	Programming
26.1	480i		Main KCPO-LD programming (4:3)
26.2	480i		Retro TV (4:3)
26.3	480i		One America Plus (4:3)

KCPO was planning to flash-cut to digital broadcasting in 2015, and would carry Retro TV on a digital subchannel. It converted to digital in spring 2020.
