= Reliance, South Dakota =

- Town
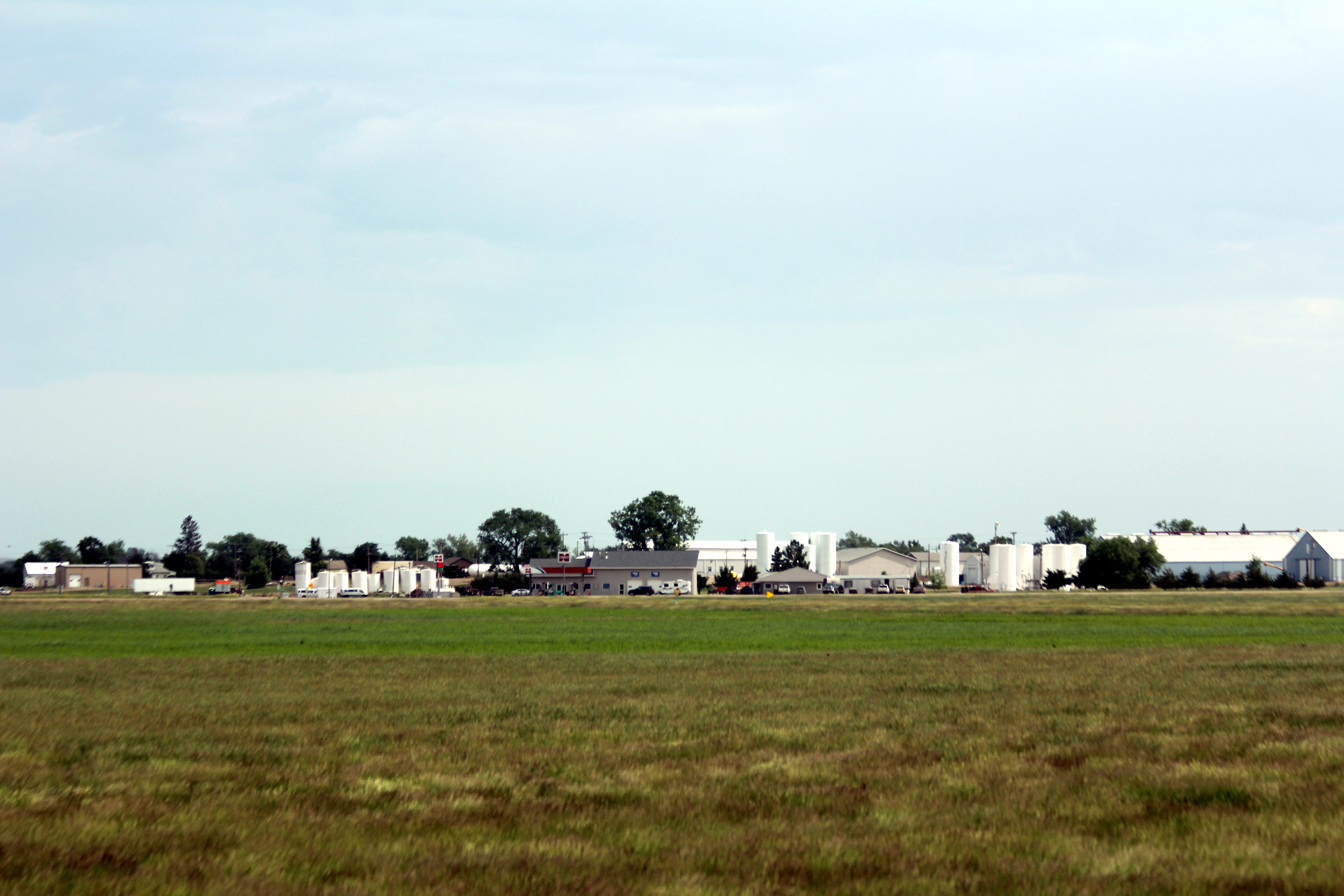
- Panorama of Reliance

- Location in Lyman County and the state of South Dakota
- Coordinates: 43°52′47″N 99°36′06″W
- Country: United States
- State: South Dakota
- County: Lyman
- Incorporated: 1905

Area
  - Total: 1.14 sq mi (2.96 km^{2})
  - Land: 1.08 sq mi (2.81 km^{2})
  - Water: 0.054 sq mi (0.14 km^{2})
- Elevation: 1,778 ft (542 m)

Population (2020)
  - Total: 128
  - Density: 117.9/sq mi (45.52/km^{2})
- Time zone: UTC-6 (Central (CST))
  - Summer (DST): UTC-5 (CDT)
- ZIP code: 57569
- Area code: 605
- FIPS code: 46-54020
- GNIS feature ID: 1267549

Reliance is a town in Lyman County, South Dakota, United States. The population was 128 at the 2020 census.

Reliance was laid out in 1905.

== Geography ==
According to the United States Census Bureau, the town has a total area of 1.15 square miles (2.98 km^{2}), of which 1.09 square miles (2.82 km^{2}) is land and 0.06 square miles (0.16 km^{2}) is water.

Medicine Butte is near Reliance. It rises about 200 feet above the prairie, and is sacred to the Brulé Sioux people, especially those who live on the nearby Lower Brule Indian Reservation.

== Demographics ==
Historical population
Census	Pop.	Note	%±
1910	192		—
1920	317		65.1%
1930	287		−9.5%
1940	219		−23.7%
1950	215		−1.8%
1960	201		−6.5%
1970	204		1.5%
1980	190		−6.9%
1990	169		−11.1%
2000	206		21.9%
2010	191		−7.3%
2020	128		−33.0%
U.S. Decennial Census

=== 2010 census ===
As of the census of 2010, there were 191 people, 73 households, and 52 families residing in the town. The population density was 175.2 inhabitants per square mile (67.6/km^{2}). There were 85 housing units at an average density of 78.0 per square mile (30.1/km^{2}). The racial makeup of the town was 77.0% White, 0.5% African American, 17.8% Native American, 0.5% from other races, and 4.2% from two or more races. Hispanic or Latino of any race were 1.6% of the population.

There were 73 households, of which 34.2% had children under the age of 18 living with them, 58.9% were married couples living together, 6.8% had a female householder with no husband present, 5.5% had a male householder with no wife present, and 28.8% were non-families. 26.0% of all households were made up of individuals, and 12.3% had someone living alone who was 65 years of age or older. The average household size was 2.62 and the average family size was 2.96.

The median age in the town was 40.1 years. 30.9% of residents were under the age of 18; 3.1% were between the ages of 18 and 24; 22.5% were from 25 to 44; 26.2% were from 45 to 64; and 17.3% were 65 years of age or older. The gender makeup of the town was 48.2% male and 51.8% female.

=== 2000 census ===
As of the census of 2000, there were 206 people, 84 households, and 54 families residing in the town. The population density was 189.4 inhabitants per square mile (73.1/km^{2}). There were 92 housing units at an average density of 84.6 per square mile (32.7/km^{2}). The racial makeup of the town was 90.29% White, 5.34% Native American, and 4.37% from two or more races.

There were 84 households, out of which 35.7% had children under the age of 18 living with them, 47.6% were married couples living together, 10.7% had a female householder with no husband present, and 35.7% were non-families. 32.1% of all households were made up of individuals, and 11.9% had someone living alone who was 65 years of age or older. The average household size was 2.45 and the average family size was 3.11.

In the town, the population was spread out, with 28.6% under the age of 18, 9.2% from 18 to 24, 25.2% from 25 to 44, 25.2% from 45 to 64, and 11.7% who were 65 years of age or older. The median age was 37 years. For every 100 females, there were 100.0 males. For every 100 females age 18 and over, there were 101.4 males.

The median income for a household in the town was $30,833, and the median income for a family was $35,417. Males had a median income of $22,361 versus $21,875 for females. The per capita income for the town was $14,141. About 4.1% of families and 11.2% of the population were below the poverty line, including 9.2% of those under the age of eighteen and 24.0% of those 65 or over.
