= 1976–77 United States network television schedule (daytime) =

The following is the 1976–77 daytime network television schedule for the three major English-language commercial broadcast networks in the United States. It covers the weekday and weekend daytime hours from September 1976 to August 1977.

Talk shows are highlighted in yellow, local programming is white, reruns of older programming are orange, game shows are pink, soap operas are chartreuse, news programs are gold, children's programs are light purple and sports programs are light blue. New series are highlighted in bold.

PBS, the Public Broadcasting Service, was in operation, but the schedule was set by each local station.

== Monday-Friday ==
Network		6:00 am	6:30 am	7:00 am	7:30 am	8:00 am	8:30 am	9:00 am	9:30 am	10:00 am	10:30 am	11:00 am	11:30 am	noon	12:30 pm	1:00 pm	1:30 pm	2:00 pm	2:30 pm	3:00 pm	3:15 pm	3:30 pm	4:00 pm	4:30 pm	5:00 pm	5:30 pm	6:00 pm	6:30 pm
ABC	Fall	Local/syndicated programming		Good Morning America				Local/syndicated programming					Happy Days reruns	Hot Seat	All My Children	Ryan's Hope	Family Feud	The $20,000 Pyramid	One Life to Live		General Hospital		The Edge of Night	Local/syndicated programming			ABC News live feed	ABC News taped re-feed
ABC	Late October	Local/syndicated programming		Good Morning America				Local/syndicated programming					Happy Days reruns	**The Don Ho Show**	All My Children	Ryan's Hope	Family Feud	The $20,000 Pyramid	One Life to Live		General Hospital		The Edge of Night	Local/syndicated programming			ABC News live feed	ABC News taped re-feed
ABC	Winter	Local/syndicated programming		Good Morning America				Local/syndicated programming					Happy Days reruns	**The Don Ho Show**	Ryan's Hope	All My Children	Family Feud	The $20,000 Pyramid	One Life to Live		General Hospital		The Edge of Night	Local/syndicated programming			ABC Evening News live feed	ABC Evening News taped re-feed
ABC	Spring	Local/syndicated programming		Good Morning America				Local/syndicated programming					Happy Days reruns	**Second Chance**	Ryan's Hope	All My Children	Family Feud	The $20,000 Pyramid	One Life to Live		General Hospital		The Edge of Night	Local/syndicated programming			ABC Evening News live feed	ABC Evening News taped re-feed
ABC	April	Local/syndicated programming		Good Morning America				Local/syndicated programming				Happy Days reruns	Family Feud	**Second Chance**	Ryan's Hope	All My Children		The $20,000 Pyramid	One Life to Live		General Hospital		The Edge of Night	Local/syndicated programming			ABC Evening News live feed	ABC Evening News taped re-feed
ABC	Summer	Local/syndicated programming		Good Morning America				Local/syndicated programming				Happy Days reruns	Family Feud	**The Better Sex**	Ryan's Hope	All My Children		The $20,000 Pyramid	One Life to Live		General Hospital		The Edge of Night	Local/syndicated programming			ABC Evening News live feed	ABC Evening News taped re-feed
CBS	Fall	Sunrise Semester	Local/syndicated programming	CBS Morning News		Captain Kangaroo		Local/syndicated programming		The Price Is Right		Gambit	Love of Life; 11:55 am: CBS Midday News	The Young and the Restless	Search for Tomorrow	Local/syndicated programming	As the World Turns		Guiding Light	All in the Family reruns		Match Game '76	Tattletales	Local/syndicated programming				CBS Evening News live feed
CBS	Winter	Sunrise Semester	Local/syndicated programming	CBS Morning News		Captain Kangaroo		Local/syndicated programming		The Price Is Right		**Double Dare**	Love of Life; 11:55 am: CBS Midday News	The Young and the Restless	Search for Tomorrow	Local/syndicated programming	As the World Turns		Guiding Light	All in the Family reruns		Match Game '77	Tattletales	Local/syndicated programming				CBS Evening News live feed
CBS	Spring	Sunrise Semester	Local/syndicated programming	CBS Morning News		Captain Kangaroo		Local/syndicated programming		Double Dare	The Price Is Right		Love of Life; 11:55 am: CBS Midday News	The Young and the Restless	Search for Tomorrow	Local/syndicated programming	As the World Turns		Guiding Light	All in the Family reruns		Match Game '77	Tattletales	Local/syndicated programming				CBS Evening News live feed
CBS	Summer	Sunrise Semester	Local/syndicated programming	CBS Morning News		Captain Kangaroo		Local/syndicated programming		**Here's Lucy** reruns	The Price Is Right		Love of Life; 11:55 am: CBS Midday News	The Young and the Restless	Search for Tomorrow	Local/syndicated programming	As the World Turns		Guiding Light	All in the Family reruns		Match Game '77	Tattletales	Local/syndicated programming				CBS Evening News live feed
NBC	Fall	Local/syndicated programming		Today				Local/syndicated programming		Sanford and Son reruns	The Hollywood Squares; 10:57 am: NBC News Update	Wheel of Fortune	**Stumpers!**	**50 Grand Slam**	The Gong Show; 12:55 pm: NBC News Update	Local/syndicated programming	Days of Our Lives		The Doctors	Another World			Somerset	Local/syndicated programming				NBC Nightly News live feed
NBC	Winter	Local/syndicated programming		Today				Local/syndicated programming		Sanford and Son reruns	The Hollywood Squares; 10:57 am: NBC News Update	Wheel of Fortune	**Shoot for the Stars**	**Name That Tune**	**Lovers and Friends**; 12:57 pm: NBC News Update	Local/syndicated programming	Days of Our Lives		The Doctors	Another World			The Gong Show	Local/syndicated programming				NBC Nightly News live feed
NBC	Spring	Local/syndicated programming		Today				Local/syndicated programming		Sanford and Son reruns	The Hollywood Squares; 10:57 am: NBC News Update	Wheel of Fortune	**Shoot for the Stars**	**Name That Tune**	**Chico and the Man** reruns	Local/syndicated programming	Days of Our Lives		The Doctors	Another World			The Gong Show	Local/syndicated programming				NBC Nightly News live feed
NBC	Summer	Local/syndicated programming		Today				Local/syndicated programming		Sanford and Son reruns	The Hollywood Squares; 10:57 am: NBC News Update	Wheel of Fortune	**It's Anybody's Guess**	Shoot for the Stars	**Chico and the Man** reruns	Local/syndicated programming	Days of Our Lives		The Doctors	Another World			The Gong Show	Local/syndicated programming				NBC Nightly News live feed

== Additional Information ==
♦ABC had a 6 pm (ET)/5 pm (CT) feed for their newscast

- In the Pacific Time Zone (from December 1975 to March 1977), ABC's lineup had its game shows aired in the morning, while the 12 Noon to 3 PM block featured The Edge of Night, Ryan's Hope, All My Children, One Life to Live, and General Hospital in succession. After April 1977, ABC's Pacific Time Zone daytime schedule began matching that of its 10 AM-3:30PM Central Time schedule.

== Saturday ==
Network		7:00 am	7:30 am	8:00 am	8:30 am	9:00 am	9:30 am	10:00 am	10:30 am	11:00 am	11:30 am	noon	12:30 pm	1:00 pm	1:30 pm	2:00 pm	2:30 pm	3:00 pm	3:30 pm	4:00 pm	4:30 pm	5:00 pm	5:30 pm	6:00 pm	6:30 pm
ABC	Fall	Local/syndicated programming		The Tom and Jerry/Grape Ape/**Mumbly** Show		**Jabberjaw**	**The Scooby-Doo/Dynomutt Hour**		**The Krofft Supershow**			**Junior Almost Anything Goes!**	American Bandstand		ABC Sports and/or local/syndicated programming										
ABC	December	Local/syndicated programming		The Tom and Jerry/Mumbly Show	Jabberjaw	The Scooby-Doo/Dynomutt Show			**The Krofft Supershow**			**Junior Almost Anything Goes!**	American Bandstand		ABC Sports and/or local/syndicated programming										
ABC	Spring	Local/syndicated programming		The Tom and Jerry/Mumbly Show	Jabberjaw	The Scooby-Doo/Dynomutt Show			The Krofft Supershow		Super Friends (R)	The Oddball Couple (R)	American Bandstand		ABC Sports and/or local/syndicated programming										
CBS	Fall	Local/syndicated programming		**Sylvester and Tweety**	The Bugs Bunny/Road Runner Hour		**Tarzan, Lord of the Jungle**	The Shazam!/Isis Hour		**Ark II**	Clue Club	Fat Albert and the Cosby Kids	**Way Out Games**	CBS Children's Film Festival		CBS Sports and/or local/syndicated programming								CBS Evening News	Local/syndicated programming
CBS	Spring	Local/syndicated programming		**Sylvester and Tweety**	Clue Club	The Bugs Bunny/Road Runner Hour		Tarzan, Lord of the Jungle	**The New Adventures of Batman**	The Shazam!/Isis Hour		Fat Albert and the Cosby Kids	Ark II	Way Out Games	CBS Saturday Film Festival	CBS Sports and/or local/syndicated programming								CBS Evening News	Local/syndicated programming
NBC	Fall	Local		The Woody Woodpecker Show (R)	The Pink Panther Laugh-and-a-Half Hour-and-a-Half Show			**McDuff, the Talking Dog**	**Monster Squad**	Land of the Lost	**Big John, Little John**	**The Kids From C.A.P.E.R.**	**Muggsy**	NBC Sports and/or local/syndicated programming										Local/syndicated programming	NBC Saturday Night News
NBC	November	Local		The Woody Woodpecker Show (R)	The Pink Panther Laugh-and-a-Half Hour-and-a-Half Show			Speed Buggy (R)	**Monster Squad**	Space Ghost and Frankenstein Jr. (R)	**Big John, Little John**	Land of the Lost	**Muggsy**	NBC Sports and/or local/syndicated programming										Local/syndicated programming	NBC Saturday Night News
NBC	Spring	Local		The Woody Woodpecker Show (R)	The Pink Panther Laugh-and-a-Half Hour-and-a-Half Show			Speed Buggy (R)	**Monster Squad**	Space Ghost and Frankenstein Jr. (R)	**Big John, Little John**	Land of the Lost	The Kids from C.A.P.E.R.	NBC Sports and/or local/syndicated programming										Local/syndicated programming	NBC Saturday Night News

== Sunday ==
Network		7:00 am	7:30 am	8:00 am	8:30 am	9:00 am	9:30 am	10:00 am	10:30 am	11:00 am	11:30 am	noon	12:30 pm	1:00 pm	1:30 pm	2:00 pm	2:30 pm	3:00 pm	3:30 pm	4:00 pm	4:30 pm	5:00 pm	5:30 pm	6:00 pm	6:30 pm
ABC	Fall	Local/syndicated programming							The New Adventures of Gilligan (R)	The Oddball Couple (R)	**Animals, Animals, Animals**	Issues and Answers		ABC Sports and/or local/syndicated programming											
ABC	Spring	Local/syndicated programming							The New Adventures of Gilligan (R)	Junior Almost Anything Goes!	**Animals, Animals, Animals**	Issues and Answers		ABC Sports and/or local/syndicated programming											
CBS	Fall	Local/syndicated programming		The Hudson Brothers Razzle Dazzle Show (R)	Far Out Space Nuts (R)	Local/syndicated programming		Lamp Unto My Feet	Look Up and Live	Camera Three	Face the Nation	Local/syndicated programming	The NFL Today	NFL on CBS and/or local/syndicated programming										Local/syndicated programming	CBS Evening News
CBS	Winter	Local/syndicated programming		The Hudson Brothers Razzle Dazzle Show (R)	Far Out Space Nuts (R)	Local/syndicated programming		Lamp Unto My Feet	Look Up and Live	Camera Three	Face the Nation	CBS Sports and/or local/syndicated programming												Local/syndicated programming	CBS Evening News
CBS	Spring	Way Out Games	Local/syndicated programming	The Hudson Brothers Razzle Dazzle Show (R)	Far Out Space Nuts (R)	Local/syndicated programming		Lamp Unto My Feet	Look Up and Live	Camera Three	Face the Nation	CBS Sports and/or local/syndicated programming												Local/syndicated programming	CBS Evening News
NBC	Fall	Local/syndicated programming										Meet the Press	Grandstand	NFL on NBC and/or local/syndicated programming										Local/syndicated programming	NBC Sunday Night News
NBC	Winter	Local/syndicated programming											Meet The Press	NBC Sports and/or local/syndicated programming										Local/syndicated programming	NBC Sunday Night News

== See also ==
- 1976-77 United States network television schedule (prime-time)
- 1976-77 United States network television schedule (late night)

== By network ==
=== ABC ===
**Returning Series**

- The $20,000 Pyramid
- ABC Evening News
- All My Children
- American Bandstand
- The Edge of Night
- Family Feud
- General Hospital
- Good Morning America
- The Great Grape Ape Show
- Happy Days (reruns)
- Hot Seat
- Issues and Answers
- The New Adventures of Gilligan (reruns)
- The Tom and Jerry Show
- The Oddball Couple (reruns)
- One Life to Live
- Ryan's Hope
- Schoolhouse Rock!
- Super Friends (reruns)

**New Series**

- **Animals, Animals, Animals**
- **The Better Sex**
- **The Don Ho Show**
- **Jabberjaw**
- **Junior Almost Anything Goes!**
- **The Krofft Supershow**
- **The Mumbly Cartoon Show**
- **The Scooby-Doo/Dynomutt Hour**
- **Second Chance**

**Not Returning From 1975-76**

- The $10,000 Pyramid
- AM America
- Break the Bank
- Devlin (reruns)
- Groovie Goolies (reruns)
- Let's Make a Deal
- The Lost Saucer
- Make a Wish
- The Neighbors
- Rhyme and Reason
- Showoffs
- Speed Buggy (reruns)
- These Are the Days (reruns)
- Uncle Croc's Block
- You Don't Say! returned in 1978 in syndication

=== CBS ===
**Returning Series**

- All in the Family (reruns)
- As the World Turns
- The Bugs Bunny/Road Runner Hour
- Camera Three
- Captain Kangaroo
- CBS Children's Film Festival
- CBS Evening News
- CBS Morning News
- Clue Club
- Face the Nation
- Far Out Space Nuts (reruns)
- Fat Albert and the Cosby Kids
- Gambit
- Guiding Light
- The Hudson Brothers Razzle Dazzle Show (reruns)
- Lamp Unto My Feet
- Look Up and Live
- Love of Life
- Match Game
- The Price Is Right
- Search for Tomorrow
- The Secrets of Isis
- Shazam!
- Sunrise Semester
- Tattletales
- The Young and the Restless

**New Series**

- **Ark II**
- **Double Dare**
- **Here's Lucy** (reruns)
- **The New Adventures of Batman**
- **Sylvester and Tweety**
- **Tarzan, Lord of the Jungle**
- **Way Out Games**

**Not Returning From 1975-76**

- The Edge of Night (moved to ABC)
- The Ghost Busters
- Give-n-Take
- The Harlem Globetrotters Popcorn Machine (reruns)
- Musical Chairs
- The U.S. of Archie (reruns)
- Valley of the Dinosaurs (reruns)

=== NBC ===
**Returning Series**

- Another World
- Days of Our Lives
- The Doctors
- Frankenstein Jr. and the Impossibles (reruns)
- The Gong Show
- The Hollywood Squares
- Land of the Lost
- Meet the Press
- Name That Tune
- NBC Nightly News
- NBC Saturday Night News
- NBC Sunday Night News
- The New Pink Panther Show
- Sanford and Son (reruns)
- Somerset
- Space Ghost (reruns)
- Speed Buggy (reruns)
- Today
- Wheel of Fortune
- The Woody Woodpecker Show (reruns)

**New Series**

- **50 Grand Slam**
- **Big John, Little John**
- **Chico and the Man** (reruns)
- **It's Anybody's Guess**
- **The Kids From C.A.P.E.R.**
- **Lovers and Friends**
- **McDuff, the Talking Dog**
- **Monster Squad**
- **Muggsy**
- **Shoot for the Stars**
- **Stumpers!**

**Not Returning From 1975-76**

- Celebrity Sweepstakes
- Emergency +4 (reruns)
- The Fun Factory
- Go!
- High Rollers reutuned in 1978
- Jackpot
- The Magnificent Marble Machine
- Return to the Planet of the Apes
- Run, Joe, Run
- The Secret Lives of Waldo Kitty
- Sigmund and the Sea Monsters (reruns)
- Take My Advice
- Three for the Money
- Westwind
