= 1976 in American television =

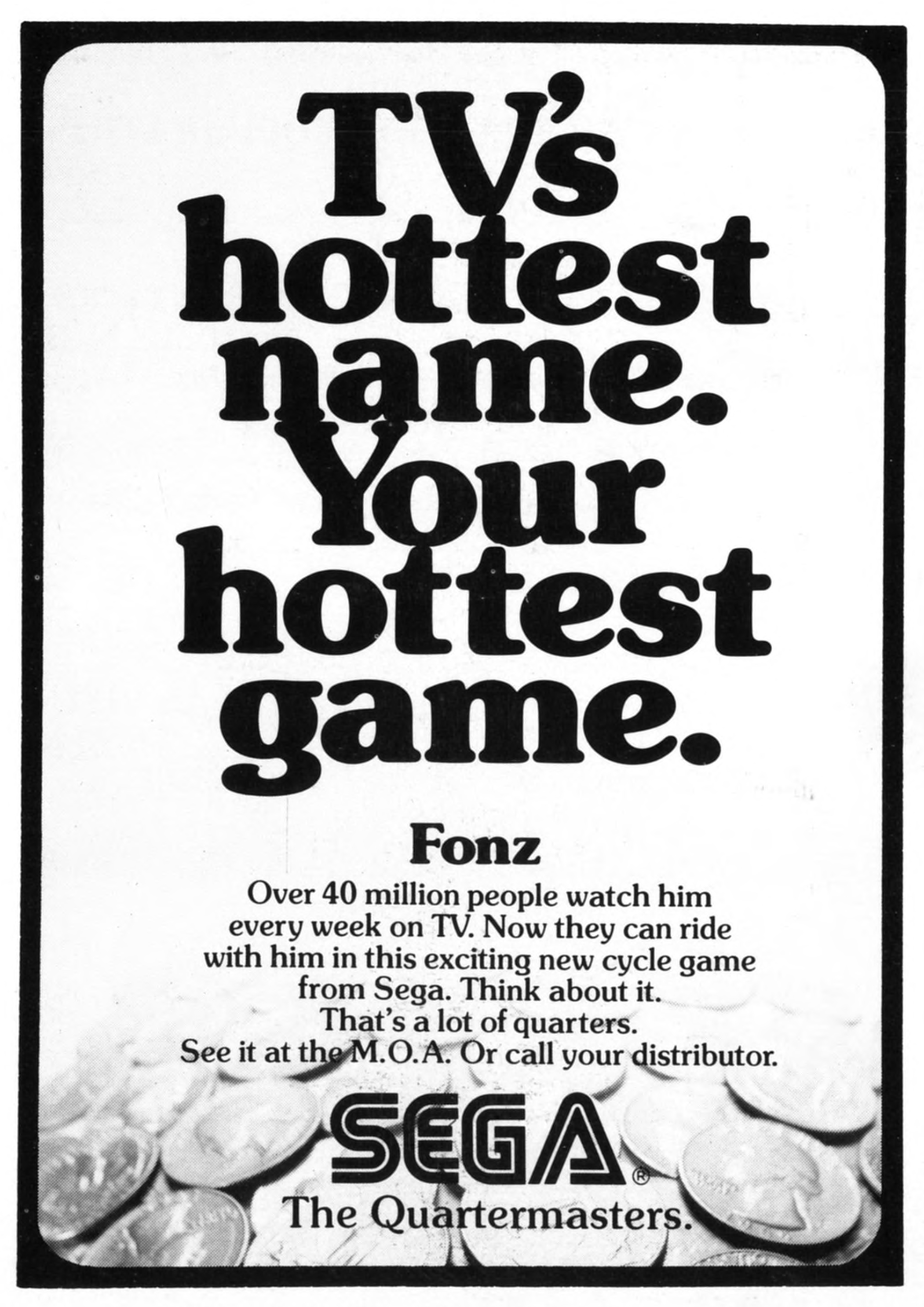
The arcade game Fonz was released in 1976, the first video game to be based on a television show (Happy Days).

This is a list of American television-related events in 1976.

== Events ==
Date	Event
January 1	NBC officially replaces its snake and peacock logos with a "modern N," composed of blue and red trapezoids—and nearly identical to the logo for Nebraska Educational Telecommunications' TV network, prompting NET to sue NBC for trademark infringement.
January 11–12	Eleanor and Franklin, a two-part miniseries starring Jane Alexander and Edward Herrmann, airs on ABC.
January 17	The Blues Brothers make their debut on NBC's Saturday Night Live, singing Slim Harpo's song "I'm a King Bee" in their Killer Bees costumes. Their first appearance as The Blues Brothers proper occurred in 1978.
January 24	The 33rd Golden Globe Awards are aired.
January 31	The 3rd American Music Awards are aired.
February 1	The miniseries Rich Man, Poor Man debuts on ABC, becoming a critical and ratings success over its 12-episode run.
February 2	Jackie Gleason, Audrey Meadows, and Art Carney reunite in an ABC special, The Honeymooners – The Second Honeymoon.
February 10	The controversial "Episode 847" of Sesame Street featuring Margaret Hamilton reprising her role as The Wicked Witch of the West from the 1939 film The Wizard of Oz is broadcast. The episode was subsequently pulled from broadcast due to a barrage of complaints leveled at the Children's Television Workshop from parents who felt that Hamilton's performance was too traumatizing for their children.
February 16	ABC airs the James Bond film On Her Majesty's Secret Service. The film was broadcast in two parts, totaling in 90 minutes each. The second part would air on February 23. The first part begins with Bond's escape from Piz Gloria on skis, which was actually in the middle portion of the film. Meanwhile, a disembodied voice (who is meant to be Bond, but not performed by George Lazenby) provides narration to explain the backstory. The edit ends at the scene in Piz Gloria, where Bond flirts with Ernst Stavro Blofeld's girls.
February 19	CBS affiliate KXLY-TV in Spokane, Washington is given a "notice of termination" by the network, stripping KXLY-TV of its affiliation effective August 19. CBS cites business reasons (KXLY-TV had been airing several network programs out of pattern in recent years) as the reason they stripped KXLY-TV. In the end, CBS decides to affiliate with ABC affiliate KREM-TV, while KXLY-TV joins ABC. The move takes effect August 8 at the request of KREM-TV, who wanted to air ABC Sports' entire coverage of the 1976 Summer Olympics.
February 28	The 18th Annual Grammy Awards are aired from the Hollywood Palladium on CBS.
February 29	The movie The Sound of Music is televised for the first time, on ABC.
February 29	CBS affiliates KRSD-TV in Rapid City, South Dakota and KDSJ-TV in Lead both shut down after a 5-year struggle over their unsatisfactory technical operations, which had rendered complaints from viewers, NBC (its former affiliation before 1970), and the Federal Communications Commission. Dakota Broadcasting Company assumes a construction permit for new stations on KRSD-TV's channel 7 and KDSJ-TV's channel 5, which respectively sign-on as KEVN and KIVV-TV on July 11. This in turn will give the Rapid City area its first full-time ABC affiliate (A full-time CBS affiliate will return to Rapid City in 1981 when the network's Sioux Falls affiliate KELO-TV signs-on translator station K15AC (now KCLO-TV)).
March 4	The 2nd People's Choice Awards air on CBS.
March 29	The 48th Academy Awards air on ABC.
April 1–2	Helter Skelter, a two-part adaptation of Vincent Bugliosi's book about the Charles Manson case, airs on CBS, with Steve Railsback portraying Manson.
April 12	ABC airs its first Monday Night Baseball broadcast, taking over the package from NBC.
April 18	The 30th Tony Awards are aired from the Shubert Theatre on ABC.
April 24	Saturday Night Live producer Lorne Michaels makes an on-air offer to pay The Beatles $3,000 to reunite on the show. John Lennon and Paul McCartney were apparently watching the show together in New York City and considered walking down to the studio to accept the check. Michaels would raise his offer to $3,200 on SNL's May 22 episode.
May 11	The 3rd Daytime Emmy Awards air from the Vivian Beaumont Theatre on CBS.
May 17	The 28th Primetime Emmy Awards air on ABC.
June 4	CBS broadcasts Game 5 of the NBA Finals between the Boston Celtics and Phoenix Suns. This triple-overtime contest, which ended in the Celtics defeating the Suns 128–126, has since been heralded as the greatest NBA game ever played.
June 7	After several years providing commentaries for the show, David Brinkley joins John Chancellor as co-anchor of NBC Nightly News, an attempt by the network to bolster ratings against the CBS Evening News and to harken back to the success it had with The Huntley-Brinkley Report.
June 15	NBC affiliate in Dayton, WLWD change its call letters to WDTN after Grinnell College bought out the station.
June 21	Deidre Hall makes her debut as Marlena Evans on Days of Our Lives. Initially brought in as the psychiatrist for Mickey Horton (John Clarke), she quickly meets his assistant Don Craig (Jed Allan). Don and Marlena would be married from 1979 to 1981. The following year, Marlena was allegedly killed by the Salem strangler Jake Kositchek (Jack Coleman), but instead her twin sister Samantha (played by Hall's real-life twin Andrea) was killed in a case of mistaken identity. In 1983, Marlena married Roman Brady (Wayne Northrop). In 1984, Roman was supposedly killed off, but the character returned in 1986, now being played by Drake Hogestyn. A year later, Hall briefly left the programme and Marlena "died" in a plane crash, before she returned in 1991. During the same time, Hogestyn's character was retconned as John Black, thus giving birth to the John Black and Marlena Evans supercouple. They first married in 1999, and the wedding continued off-and-on until Hogestyn's death in 2024. In 1995, Marlena was possessed by the Devil, leading to her taking the forms of Kristen DiMera (Eileen Davidson) and John's first dead wife Isabella Toscano (Staci Greason). The storyline was revived in 2021, when she took the forms of her husband, Steve Johnson (Stephen Nichols) and Rafe Hernandez (Galen Gering). From 2003 to 2004, Marlena became The Salem Stalker, who killed multiple veteran characters, including her former husband Roman Brady (now played by Josh Taylor). She was "killed off" again at the end of the story line, but all of her victims were brought later back alive on a tropical island. Hall and Hogestyn were fired in late 2008 due to budget cuts, but they returned in 2011. Hall had remained on the show since then.
June 26	Japanese pro wrestler Antonio Inoki and American boxer Muhammad Ali fight each other in "The War of the Worlds".
July 1	The pay TV network Showtime makes its debut, appearing only on a Dublin, California cable system. The network would expand nationally in 1978.
July 4	U.S. television networks present extensive coverage of nationwide events commemorating the country's bicentennial.
July 11	KYCU-TV of Cheyenne, Wyoming (and its satellites) drop all NBC programs and switch to a primary ABC affiliation, which will last until 1984.
July 12	Family Feud premieres on ABC and would become daytime television's number 1 game show within the next few years and beyond.
July 15	Family Feud had its first Fast Money win on July 15, 1976, three days after the show's very first episode the same year.
September 6	In an experiment, New York City station WOR-TV replaces its normal programming for 5 exclusive nights of British shows from Thames Television.
September 16	WECA-TV in Tallahassee, Florida begins broadcasting, giving the Tallahassee market its first full-time ABC affiliate.
September 23	The first of three debates between U.S. presidential candidates Gerald Ford and Jimmy Carter air in prime time; they are the first presidential debates ever televised in color, as well as the first debates between major party nominees for U.S. president since 1960.
October 4	Newly arrived from NBC, Barbara Walters joins Harry Reasoner as co-anchor of the ABC Evening News. The pair have a noticeable lack of on-air chemistry, and by 1978 Reasoner would leave ABC to return to CBS and 60 Minutes.
October 6	The second 1976 presidential debate is aired with Pauline Frederick moderating.
October 11	Jane Pauley makes her debut on NBC's Today.
October 11	The 1976 Country Music Association Awards air from the Grand Ole Opry House on CBS.
October 15	The first ever vice presidential debate takes place between senators Bob Dole and Walter Mondale.
October 22	The final presidential debate between Carter and Ford takes place with Barbara Walters of ABC moderating.
October 29	WGTQ in Sault Ste. Marie, Michigan signs-on as a full satellite of ABC affiliate WGTU in Traverse City, bringing the full ABC schedule to the Eastern Upper Peninsula.
November 7–8	The film Gone with the Wind makes its broadcast television debut on NBC; it would be the highest-rated program ever aired on a single network, only to be surpassed by Roots the following January.
November 9	The Museum of Broadcasting opens on the first 3 floors of the Paley Foundation building in New York City. The museum would later be renamed The Paley Center for Media.
November 13	The Carol Burnett Show airs Went with the Wind!, a movie parody of Gone With the Wind, five days after the film's network TV debut. TV Guide ranked the sketch #53 on its list of "Top 100 Episodes of All Time".
December 10	Rudolph's Shiny New Year premiered on ABC at the time when Christmas is around, with voice casts such as Billie Mae Richards as the voice of Rudolph, with special guest stars like Red Skelton, Morey Amsterdam and more
December 14	Barbara Walters airs her first interview special for ABC, with guests Jimmy and Rosalynn Carter, Barbra Streisand, and Jon Peters.
December 17	At 1:00 p.m. (ET), Atlanta, Georgia station WTCG-TV begins satellite transmission of its regular programming to four cable systems, thus becoming the first superstation.
December 31	President Gerald Ford presents the last of the Bicentennial Minutes on CBS; the vignettes had been airing nightly on the network since July 4, 1974.
Also in 1976	CBS' Match Game is the #1 rated game show on daytime television for the fourth consecutive year.
Also in 1976	The Olympics, broadcast from Montreal, Quebec, Canada, draw an estimated one billion viewers worldwide.
Also in 1976	Matsushita introduces the VHS home video cassette recorder to compete with Sony's Betamax system.

== Programs ==
=== Debuting this year ===
Date	Show	Network
January 5	Take My Advice	NBC
January 14	The Bionic Woman	ABC
January 20	The Adams Chronicles	PBS
January 21	Dance in America	PBS
January 27	Laverne & Shirley	ABC
January 28	The Dumplings	NBC
January 30	The Practice	NBC
February 2	Jigsaw John	NBC
February 13	Sara	CBS
March 9	Family	ABC
April 12	Break the Bank	ABC
May 3	Joe Forrester	ABC
May 31	Viva Valdez	ABC
June 14	The Fun Factory	NBC
June 14	The Gong Show	NBC
July 12	Family Feud	ABC
July 12	Hot Seat	ABC
July 26	Comedy Theatre	NBC
August 5	What's Happening!!	ABC
August 14	Clue Club	CBS
August 30	New Howdy Doody Show	Syndication
August 31	Alice	CBS
September 4	Clue Club	CBS
September 6	In Search of...	Syndication
September 9	Delvecchio	CBS
September 11	Ark II	CBS
September 11	Tarzan, Lord of the Jungle	CBS
September 11	Way Out Games	CBS
September 11	Big John, Little John	NBC
September 11	The Kids From C.A.P.E.R.	NBC
September 11	McDuff, the Talking Dog	NBC
September 11	Monster Squad	NBC
September 11	Muggsy	NBC
September 11	Dr. Shrinker	ABC
September 11	Electra Woman and Dyna Girl	ABC
September 11	Jabberjaw	ABC
September 11	Junior Almost Anything Goes!	ABC
September 11	The Krofft Supershow	ABC
September 11	The Mumbly Cartoon Show	ABC
September 11	The Scooby-Doo Show	ABC
September 11	The Scooby-Doo/Dynomutt Hour	ABC
September 12	Animals, Animals, Animals	ABC
September 17	Spencer's Pilots	CBS
September 19	Cos	ABC
September 20	All's Fair	CBS
September 20	The Muppet Show	Syndication
September 21	Rich Man, Poor Man Book II	ABC
September 21	Baa Baa Black Sheep	NBC
September 21	Bronk	CBS
September 22	The Quest	NBC
September 22	Ball Four	CBS
September 22	Charlie's Angels	ABC
September 23	The Tony Randall Show	ABC
September 23	Gemini Man	NBC
September 24	Serpico	NBC
September 25	Holmes & Yo-Yo	ABC
September 25	Mr. T and Tina	ABC
September 30	The Nancy Walker Show	ABC
October 3	Quincy, M.E.	NBC
October 4	50 Grand Slam	NBC
October 4	Stumpers	NBC
October 16	Most Wanted	ABC
October 25	The Don Ho Show	ABC
November 11	Gibbsville	NBC
December 1	C.P.O. Sharkey	NBC
December 1	The McLean Stevenson Show	NBC
December 1	Sirota's Court	NBC
December 6	The Feather and Father Gang	ABC
December 13	Double Dare	CBS

=== Ending this year ===
Date	Show	Debut
January 5	Mobile One	1975
January 25	McCoy	1975
February 14	Uncle Croc's Block	1975
February 20	Mister Rogers' Neighborhood (returned in 1979)	1968
February 25	Clyde Frog Show	1974
March 3	Cannon	1971
March 12	The Magnificent Marble Machine	1975
March 28	Bronk	1975
March 30	The Rookies	1972
March 31	The Dumplings	1976
April 4	Ellery Queen	1975
April 9	The Neighbors	1975
April 13	The Adams Chronicles	1976
April 29	Harry O	1974
May 7	Sara	1976
June 11	Take My Advice	1976
June 14	Jigsaw John	1976
July 9	Rhyme and Reason	1975
July 29	Marcus Welby, M.D.	1969
September	The Letter People	1974
September 5	Make a Wish	1971
September 6	Comedy Theatre (returned in 1979)	1976
September 6	Medical Center	1969
September 6	Viva Valdez	1976
September 19	High Rollers (returned in 1978)	1974
October 1	The Fun Factory	1976
October 16	Shazam!	1974
October 22	Hot Seat	1976
October 23	The Secrets of Isis	1975
October 28	Gemini Man	1976
October 30	Fat Albert and the Cosby Kids (returned in 1979)	1972
November 20	McDuff, the Talking Dog	1976
December 4	Land of the Lost	1974
December 4	Big John, Little John	1976
December 4	Monster Squad	1976
December 10	Gambit (returned in 1980 on NBC as "Las Vegas Gambit")	1972
December 11	Clue Club	1976
December 18	Ark II	1976
December 18	Jabberjaw	1976
December 18	The Mumbly Cartoon Show	1976
December 18	The Scooby-Doo/Dynomutt Hour	1976
December 25	Dr. Shrinker	1976
December 25	Electra Woman and Dyna Girl	1976
December 30	Gibbsville	1976
December 31	Bicentennial Minutes	1974
December 31	50 Grand Slam	1976
December 31	Somerset	1970
December 31	Stumpers	1976

== Networks and services ==
=== Launches ===
Network	Type	Launch date	Notes	Source
Mobil Showcase Network	Cable television	Unknown		
Showtime	Cable television	July 1		
WTCG-TV	Cable television	December 17		

=== Conversions and rebrandings ===
There are no conversions and rebrandings for Cable and satellite television channels in this year.

=== Closures ===
Network	Type	Launch date	Notes	Source
MGM Family Network	Cable and satellite	September 9		

== Television stations ==
=== Station launches ===
Date	City of License/Market	Station	Channel	Affiliation	Notes/Ref.
January 20	Wausau/Rhinelander, Wisconsin	WHRM-TV	20	PBS	Part of Wisconsin Public Television
January 30	Pierre, South Dakota	KPRY-TV	4	PBS	Part of South Dakota Public Broadcasting
March 9	Lowry, South Dakota	KQSD-TV	11	PBS	Part of South Dakota Public Broadcasting
March 17	Eau Claire/La Crosse, Wisconsin	WHLA-TV	31	PBS	Part of Wisconsin Public Television
May 31	Chicago, Illinois	WCFC-TV	38	CTN	
July 11	Lead, South Dakota	KIVV-TV	5	ABC	Satellite of KEVN-TV/Rapid City
July 11	Rapid City, South Dakota	KEVN-TV	7	ABC	
September 4	San Francisco, California	KTSF-TV	26	Multicultural independent	
September 8	Monroe, Louisiana	KLTM-TV	12	PBS	Part of Louisiana Public Broadcasting
September 16	Tallahassee, Florida	WECA-TV	27	ABC	
September 18	Fayetteville, Arkansas	KAFT	13	PBS	Part of the Arkansas Educational Television Network
October 2	Arkadelphia, Arkansas	KETG	9	PBS	Part of the Arkansas Educational Television Network
October 3	Crossville, Tennessee	WCPT-TV	55	Independent	
October 29	Sault Ste. Marie, Michigan	WGTQ	8	ABC	Satellite of WGTU/Traverse City, Michigan
November 25	Allentown, Pennsylvania	WFMZ-TV	69	Independent	
December 15	Park Falls/Superior, Wisconsin (Duluth, Minnesota)	WLEF-TV	36	PBS	Part of Wisconsin Public Television

=== Network affiliation changes ===
Date	City of License/Market	Station	Channel	Old affiliation	New affiliation	Notes/Ref.
March 1	Salem, Oregon	KVDO-TV	3	Independent (commercial)	PBS/OEPBS	Not effective until September 20 because tower was deliberately collapsed
July 11	Cheyenne, Wyoming	KYCU-TV	5	NBC (primary); ABC (secondary)	ABC (exclusive)	
August 8	Spokane, Washington	KREM-TV	2	ABC	CBS	
August 8	Spokane, Washington	KXLY-TV	4	CBS	ABC	

=== Station closures ===
Date	City of License/Market	Station	Channel	Affiliation	First air date	Notes/Ref.
February 29	Lead, South Dakota	KDSJ-TV	5	CBS	January 1960	Satellite of KRSD-TV/Rapid City
February 29	Rapid City, South Dakota	KRSD-TV	7	CBS	January 21, 1958	Channels of KRSD-TV and KDSJ-TV reoccupied that July by KEVN and KIVV
June 30	Columbus, Ohio	WGSF	31	PBS	March 18, 1963	

== Births ==
Date	Name	Notability
January 1	Tank	Actor, R&B singer
January 1	Dan Kloeffler	Journalist
January 2	Paz Vega	Actress
January 3	Nicholas Gonzalez	Actor
January 6	Danny Pintauro	Actor (Who's the Boss?)
January 6	Johnny Yong Bosch	Actor (Bleach, Power Rangers, Three Delivery)
January 6	Isha Sesay	British journalist of Sierra Leonean descent
January 7	Tyron Leitso	Canadian actor (Being Erica)
January 7	Alfonso Soriano	Dominican former professional baseball left fielder
January 8	Jessica Leccia	Actress (Guiding Light, The Bold and the Beautiful)
January 8	Jenny Lewis	Actress
January 8	Josh Meyers	Actor (Mad TV, That '70s Show)
January 9	Todd Grisham	Sports broadcaster (DAZN, UFC, WWE)
January 10	Eduardo Garza	Voice actor
January 13	Michael Peña	Actor
January 15	Meredith Bishop	Actress (The Secret World of Alex Mack)
January 15	Dorian Missick	Actress (Southland)
January 16	Carrie Keranen	Voice actress (Teenage Mutant Ninja Turtles, Kappa Mikey, Ellen's Acres)
January 16	Derek Richardson	Actor
January 17	Anne Stedman	Actress
January 19	Ken Lawson	Actor and rapper (The Parkers)
January 19	Drew Powell	Actor (Gotham)
January 19	Marsha Thomason	English actress (Las Vegas, Lost, White Collar)
January 20	Pedro Bromfman	Brazilian musician
January 23	Tony Lucca	Actor (Mickey Mouse Club, Malibu Shores)
January 23	Nigel McGuinness	English professional wrestling commentator
January 26	Gilles Marini	French-American actor (Brothers & Sisters, Switched at Birth, Devious Maids)
January 28	Rick Ross	Rapper
January 30	Andy Milonakis	Actor (The Andy Milonakis Show, Adventure Time, Future-Worm!) and comedian
January 31	Paul Scheer	Actor (The League, NTSF:SD:SUV::, Fresh Off the Boat, Apple & Onion)
February 2	Lori Beth Denberg	Actress (All That, The Steve Harvey Show)
February 3	Isla Fisher	Australian actress (Arrested Development)
February 3	Tim Heidecker	Actor
February 4	Cam'ron	Rapper, actor
February 7	Kelly Choi	South Korean-American television host
February 8	Pooch Hall	Actor (The Game)
February 9	Charlie Day	Actor (It's Always Sunny in Philadelphia)
February 10	Keeley Hawes	Actress
February 11	Brice Beckham	Actor (Mr. Belvedere)
February 12	Jenni Falconer	Television presenter
February 12	Aarón Sánchez	Television personality
February 14	Erica Leerhsen	Actress
February 15	Brandon Boyd	Singer
February 16	Janet Varney	Actress (Korra on The Legend of Korra)
February 16	Eric Byrnes	Broadcaster
February 19	Dan Fogelman	Screenwriter
February 20	Chris Cillizza	Political commentator
February 23	Kelly Macdonald	Scottish actress (Boardwalk Empire)
February 24	Crista Flanagan	Comedic actress (Mad TV, Mad Men)
February 25	Rashida Jones	Actress (Parks and Recreation)
February 28	Ali Larter	Actress (Heroes, Legends)
February 29	Ja Rule	Rapper, actor
March 1	Luke Mably	Actor
March 2	Jeff Wadlow	Writer
March 5	Neil Jackson	Actor
March 5	Lucian Msamati	Actor
March 8	Freddie Prinze Jr.	Actor
March 8	Hines Ward	Coach
March 11	Jason Reich	Writer
March 13	Danny Masterson	Actor (That '70s Show, The Ranch)
March 14	Merlin Santana	Actor (Romeo Santana on The Steve Harvey Show) (died 2002)
March 14	Corey Stoll	Actor
March 14	Brian Quinn	Actor
March 15	Cara Pifko	Actress
March 16	Daniel Gillies	Canadian-born New Zealand actor (The Vampire Diaries, Saving Hope, The Originals)
March 16	Paul Schneider	Actor
March 16	Kyle Newman	Filmmaker
March 16	Jason Johnson	Professor
March 17	Brittany Daniel	Actress
March 18	Christopher Hanke	Actor
March 18	Marnie Stern	Singer
March 19	Rachel Blanchard	Canadian actress (Are You Afraid of the Dark?, Clueless, 7th Heaven)
March 19	Nicholas Stoller	Director
March 21	Rachael MacFarlane	Voice actress (Fillmore!, The Grim Adventures of Billy & Mandy, Codename: Kids Next Door, American Dad!)
March 22	Reese Witherspoon	Actress (Return to Lonesome Dove)
March 22	Kellie Shanygne Williams	Actress (Family Matters)
March 23	Michelle Monaghan	Actress (True Detective)
March 23	Keri Russell	Actress (Mickey Mouse Club, Felicity)
March 23	Angela Kang	Writer
March 26	Amy Smart	Actress (Felicity)
March 27	Craig Wayans	Actor
March 30	Jessica Cauffiel	Actress
March 31	Josh Saviano	Actor (The Wonder Years)
April 1	Troy Baker	Voice actor
April 2	Adam F. Goldberg	Writer
April 4	James Roday Rodriguez	Actor (Psych)
April 5	Sterling K. Brown	Actor (This Is Us)
April 6	Candace Cameron Bure	Actress (Full House, Fuller House)
April 7	Kevin Alejandro	Actor
April 7	Eric Wareheim	Actor
April 13	Glenn Howerton	Actor (It's Always Sunny in Philadelphia)
April 13	Jonathan Brandis	Actor (seaQuest DSV) (d. 2003)
April 16	David Lyons	Actor (ER, Sea Patrol, Revolution)
April 16	Lukas Haas	Actor and musician
April 18	Melissa Joan Hart	Actress (Clarissa Explains it All, Sabrina, the Teenage Witch, Sabrina: The Animated Series, Melissa & Joey, The Loud House, The Casagrandes)
April 18	Sean Maguire	English actor (Once Upon a Time)
April 18	Kevin Rankin	Actor
April 19	Wyatt Cenac	Actor (The Daily Show, Fanboy & Chum Chum, People of Earth)
April 20	Joey Lawrence	Actor (Gimme a Break!, Blossom, Brotherly Love, Run of the House, Melissa & Joey)
April 25	Tim Duncan	NBA basketball player
April 26	Thurop Van Orman	Voice actor (The Marvelous Misadventures of Flapjack, Gravity Falls)
April 28	Michael Carbonaro	Actor
May 1	Darius McCrary	Actor (Family Matters)
May 1	James Murray	Actor
May 5	Peter Morén	Singer
May 8	Luke Burbank	Radio host
May 10	Rhona Bennett	Singer and actress (Mickey Mouse Club)
May 17	Rochelle Aytes	Actress (Mistresses)
May 19	Kevin Garnett	NBA basketball player
May 25	Ethan Suplee	Actor (Boy Meets World, My Name Is Earl)
May 25	Erinn Hayes	Actress
May 26	Jay Feely	Sportscaster
May 27	RJD2	Musician
May 28	Liam O'Brien	Actor
May 30	Omri Katz	Actor
May 31	Colin Farrell	Actor
June 2	Marek Larwood	Actor
June 3	Jamie McMurray	Race car driver
June 5	Marc Worden	Actor (Mickey Mouse Club, Batman Beyond, The Zeta Project)
June 5	Joe Gatto	Actor
June 5	Aesop Rock	Rapper
June 6	Emilie-Claire Barlow	Canadian actress (Total Drama)
June 6	Jonathan Nolan	Screenwriter
June 7	David Buckley	Composer
June 8	Eion Bailey	Actor (Band of Brothers, Once Upon a Time)
June 16	Tom Lenk	Actor
June 17	Pedro Miguel Arce	Actor
June 18	Alana de la Garza	Actress (Law & Order, Law & Order: Special Victims Unit, CSI: Miami)
June 18	Blake Shelton	Singer
June 18	Christina Pazsitzky	Actress
June 19	Ryan Hurst	Actor
June 20	Jarrad Paul	Actor
June 21	Antonio Cochran	Former football player
June 21	Nathan Darrow	Actor
June 22	Mike O'Brien	Actor, writer and comedian (Saturday Night Live)
June 23	Emmanuelle Vaugier	Canadian actress (One Tree Hill, CSI: NY, Two and a Half Men) and model
June 26	Dave Rubin	Conservative political commentator
June 27	Joseph Sikora	Actor
June 27	Wagner Moura	Actor
June 28	Camille Guaty	Actress (Prison Break, Scorpion)
June 28	Jason J. Lewis	Voice actor (Justice League Action)
June 29	Omar Doom	Actor
July 1	Thomas Sadoski	TV actor
July 1	Haaz Sleiman	TV actor
July 1	Kristen Welker	TV journalist
July 2	Erin Burnett	TV anchor (Erin Burnett OutFront, Squawk on the Street)
July 3	Andrea Barber	Actress (Full House, Fuller House)
July 4	Rohan Nichol	Actor
July 5	Jamie Elman	Actor
July 7	Hamish Linklater	Actor
July 9	Fred Savage	Actor and director (The Wonder Years, Generator Rex, The Grinder, Friends from College)
July 9	Elliot Cowan	Actor
July 10	Adrian Grenier	Actor
July 12	Anna Friel	English actress (Pushing Daisies)
July 12	Alison Wright	English actress
July 15	Diane Kruger	Actress (The Bridge)
July 15	Gabriel Iglesias	Actor (The Emperor's New School, Gabriel Iglesias Presents Stand Up Revolution, Cristela)
July 15	Jim Jones	Rapper
July 15	Seth Gordon	Screenwriter
July 16	Bobby Lashley	Wrestler
July 17	Brian K. Vaughan	Writer
July 17	Luke Bryan	Singer
July 17	Dagmara Domińczyk	Actress
July 17	Eric Winter	Actor
July 17	Eddie Shin	Actor
July 19	Vinessa Shaw	Actress
July 19	Benedict Cumberbatch	Actor (Sherlock)
July 20	Erica Hill	Journalist
July 21	Jaime Murray	Actress
July 27	Ryan Michelle Bathe	Actress (Boston Legal, Army Wives)
July 27	Seamus Dever	Actor (Castle)
July 27	Chad Fischer	Singer
July 28	Jacoby Shaddix	Actor
July 29	Peter Alexander	Journalist
July 31	Eric Winter	Actor
July 31	Rod Monroe	Football player (died 2017)
August 2	Sam Worthington	Actor
August 4	David Lewis	Actor
August 6	Melissa George	Actress (Alias)
August 6	Josh Schwartz	Screenwriter
August 6	Soleil Moon Frye	Actress (Punky Brewster, Sabrina the Teenage Witch, The Proud Family, Bratz, Planet Sheen)
August 8	JC Chasez	Actor (Mickey Mouse Club) and singer (*NSYNC)
August 8	Drew Lachey	Actor and singer
August 8	Tawny Cypress	Actress (Heroes, Unforgettable)
August 9	Jessica Capshaw	Actress (The Practice, Grey's Anatomy) and stepdaughter of Steven Spielberg
August 9	Rhona Mitra	English actress (The Last Ship)
August 11	Will Friedle	Actor (Boy Meets World, The Random Years, Girl Meets World), voice actor (Batman Beyond, Kim Possible, Justice League Unlimited, The Secret Saturdays, Batman: The Brave and the Bold, The Penguins of Madagascar, ThunderCats, Ultimate Spider-Man, Teen Titans Go!, Transformers: Robots in Disguise, Guardians of the Galaxy, Future-Worm!, Stretch Armstrong and the Flex Fighters, DC Super Hero Girls)
August 12	Antoine Walker	NBA basketball player
August 17	Scott Halberstadt	Actor (Drake & Josh)
August 17	Natalie Gold	Actress
August 19	M. Wartella	Animator
August 20	Kristen Miller	Actress (USA High)
August 22	Matt Oberg	Actor
August 23	Scott Caan	Actor (Hawaii Five-0) and son of James Caan
August 24	Alex O'Loughlin	Australian actor (Hawaii Five-0)
August 26	Mike Colter	Actor
August 27	Sarah Chalke	Actress (Roseanne, Scrubs, How I Met Your Mother, Rick and Morty)
August 27	RonReaco Lee	Actor (Sister, Sister, Let's Stay Together)
August 30	Sarah-Jane Potts	Actress
August 31	Shar Jackson	Actress and singer (Moesha)
September 3	Ashley Jones	Actress
September 5	Carice van Houten	Dutch actress (Game of Thrones)
September 6	Robin Atkin Downes	Actor
September 6	Rodrigo Amarante	Arranger
September 6	Naomie Harris	Actress
September 7	Oliver Hudson	Actor (Rules of Engagement, Nashville, Scream Queens)
September 9	Joey Newman	Composer
September 15	Rob Wiethoff	Actor
September 18	Sophina Brown	Actress (Shark, Numb3rs)
September 19	Alison Sweeney	Actress and host (Days of Our Lives, The Biggest Loser)
September 19	Carter Oosterhouse	Television personality
September 20	Enuka Okuma	Canadian actress (Rookie Blue, Steven Universe)
September 20	Jon Bernthal	Actor
September 20	Ainsley Earhardt	Television personality
September 24	Reagan Dale Neis	Actress
September 24	Stephanie McMahon	Businesswoman and WWE personality
October 1	Danielle Bisutti	Actress (True Jackson, VP)
October 2	Mandisa	Singer (American Idol) (died 2024)
October 3	Seann William Scott	Actor
October 4	Alicia Silverstone	Actress (Braceface, Miss Match)
October 5	Matt Hamill	Mixed martial artist and wrestler
October 7	Taylor Hicks	Singer
October 8	Peter Stickles	Actor
October 9	Sam Riegel	Voice actor (Teenage Mutant Ninja Turtles, Wander Over Yonder, Pickle and Peanut)
October 9	Nick Swardson	Actor
October 11	Emily Deschanel	Actress (Bones)
October 11	Dave Briggs	Journalist
October 15	Jody Hill	Film producer
October 17	Adrian Sturges	British-born film producer
October 19	Desmond Harrington	Actor (Dexter)
October 19	Omar Gooding	Actor (Hangin' with Mr. Cooper, Smart Guy) and rapper
October 20	Dan Fogler	Actor
October 21	Jeremy Miller	Actor (Growing Pains)
October 23	Ryan Reynolds	Actor (Two Guys and a Girl)
October 23	Jon Huertas	Actor (Castle)
October 23	Cat Deeley	Television host
October 26	Brad Neely	Writer
October 26	Thurop Van Orman	Voice actor
October 29	Milena Govich	Actress (Law & Order)
October 31	Piper Perabo	Actress (Covert Affairs)
November 1	Chad Lindberg	Actor
November 4	Jonathan Kimmel	Actor
November 5	Sebastian Arcelus	Actor
November 6	Sal Vulcano	Actor
November 9	Josh Kaufman	Singer
November 11	Lisa Gleave	Actress and model (The Price Is Right)
November 12	Tevin Campbell	Actor and singer
November 17	Brandon Call	Actor (Step by Step)
November 17	Diane Neal	Actress
November 18	Dominic Armato	Voice actor (Sputz Ringley on Rocket Power)
November 18	Steven Pasquale	Actor
November 18	Jessi Alexander	Singer
November 19	Robin Dunne	Actor
November 20	Laura Harris	Actress
November 23	Joe Sumner	Singer
November 26	Maia Campbell	Actress and model (South Central, In the House)
November 27	Jaleel White	Actor (Steve Urkel on Family Matters)
November 28	Geno Segers	Actor (Pair of Kings)
November 28	Ryan Kwanten	Australian actor (Home and Away, Summerland, True Blood, The Oath)
November 29	Anna Faris	Actress (Mom)
November 29	Chadwick Boseman	Actor (What If...?, Lincoln Heights) (died 2020)
November 29	Ehren McGhehey	Sunt performer (Jackass)
November 29	Julian Ovenden	Actor
November 30	Peter Sullivan	Screenwriter
December 1	Laura Ling	Writer
December 5	Amy Acker	Actress (Angel, Alias, Happy Town, Person of Interest, The Gifted)
December 6	Lindsay Price	Actress and singer (Beverly Hills, 90210, Lipstick Jungle)
December 7	Mark Duplass	Actor
December 7	T. J. Lavin	Host
December 7	Georges Laraque	Sports commentator
December 8	Dominic Monaghan	Actor (Lost, Wild Things with Dominic Monaghan)
December 14	Tammy Blanchard	Actress
December 16	Leland Chapman	Bail bondsman and bounty hunter
December 17	Dan Hageman	Writer
December 26	Nadia Litz	Actress
December 27	Aaron Stanford	Actor (Nikita)
December 28	Brendan Hines	Actor
December 28	Joe Manganiello	Actor
December 29	Danny McBride	Actor (Eastbound & Down, Vice Principals)
December 31	Chris Terrio	Screenwriter
December 31	Clayton Morris	Host

== Deaths ==
Date	Name	Age	Notability
June 25	Jay Jostyn	74	Radio and TV actor
August 28	Anissa Jones	18	Actress (Buffy on Family Affair)
December 12	Jack Cassidy	49	Actor (He & She)

== Television debuts ==
- Rick Moranis – SCTV
- Kim Cattrall – Dead on Target
- Jane Pauley – Today
- Jeffrey Jones – The Adams Chronicles
- Kim Basinger – Gemini Man
- Dave Thomas – SCTV
- Ray Winstone – The Sweeney
- Jonathan Banks – Barnaby Jones
- Harold Ramis – SCTV
