= Mugsy =

Mugsy or Muggsy may refer to:

== Nickname ==
- Muggsy Bogues (born 1965), American basketball player-coach
- Muggsy Spanier (1901–1967), American jazz cornet player
- John McGraw (1873–1934), American baseball player and manager
- Owen Mulligan (born 1981), Irish Gaelic football player

== Fictional characters ==
- Mugsy of Rocky and Mugsy, gangsters in Looney Tunes shorts
- Mugsy, a reporter in the 1937 film The Adventurous Blonde
- Mugsy, a smuggler in the 1950 film The Lady Craved Excitement
- Mugsy, in the 1951 film The Mating Season
- Mugsy, in the 1952 film Mother Riley Meets the Vampire
- Mugsy, a bank robber in the 1953 film Abbott and Costello Go to Mars
- Mugsy, a sorority house mother in the 1984 film Mugsy's Girls
- Mugsy, a dog in the 1991 animated film Rover Dangerfield
- Mugsy, a henchman of the Ventriloquist in Batman: The Animated Series
- Mugsy, a waiter in the 1995 play Dealer's Choice by Patrick Marber
- Mugsy, a bartender in the 1997 film Boogie Nights
- Muggsy Malloy, teenage protagonist of the 1976–77 television series Muggsy
- Mugsy O'Day, a gangster in the 1940 film Brother Orchid
- Mugsy Winthrop, a gangster in the 1939 film Daughter of the Tong

== Other uses ==
- Muggsy (TV series), a 1976–77 television series
- Mugsy (video game), a 1980s computer game, also the title character
- Muggsy, a mascot for the Salem Red Sox Minor League Baseball team
- Mugsy, a humor strip in the American anthology comic book series Zip Comics
