= Barnet Kellman =

American actor

- Born: November 9, 1947 (age 78); New York City, New York, U.S.
- Education: Colgate University (BA); Yale University (MFA); Union Institute and University (PhD)
- Occupations: Film director, television producer, actor
- Years active: 1980–present

Barnet Kellman (born November 9, 1947) is an American theatre, television and film director, television producer and film actor, and educator, best known for the premiere productions of new American plays, and for the pilots of long-running television series such as Murphy Brown and Mad About You. He is the recipient of two Emmy Awards and a Directors Guild of America Award. He is the co-founder and director of USC Comedy at the School of Cinematic Arts, and holds the school's Robin Williams Endowed Chair in Comedy.

== Early life and education ==
Barnet Kellman was born in New York City, and raised in suburban Long Island. His father was Joseph A. G. Kellman, an attorney, and his mother was Verona Kellman (née Kramer).

He attended Colgate University, was a member of Phi Beta Kappa, and graduated cum laude in 1969. He attended Yale School of Drama, eventually earning his Ph.D. from Union Institute at Antioch on a Danforth Graduate Fellowship. As a Thomas J. Watson Fellow, he studied theater and film in Europe and worked with renowned theater pioneer Joan Littlewood at her Theatre Royal in Stratford, East London, appearing in her production of The Marie Lloyd Story.

== Theatre ==
Kellman began as an actor, joining Actors' Equity at age nineteen. While still at Colgate, he was an assistant to director Alan Schneider on the Broadway production of Edward Albee's A Delicate Balance. In the 1970s, he was a mainstay on New York City's Off-Broadway. He directed productions in the early seasons of Playwrights Horizons, and the Manhattan Theatre Club.

His WPA Theatre production of Key Exchange introduced playwright Kevin Wade and moved to the Orpheum Theatre for a year-long run, while his acclaimed Circle Rep production of Danny and the Deep Blue Sea introduced playwright John Patrick Shanley and actor John Turturro. For Joseph Papp's New York Shakespeare Festival, he directed the works of David Rabe and William Hauptman. He was an Associate Director of the Williamstown Theatre Festival and, for ten years, a regular director at the Eugene O’Neill Theatre Center's National Playwrights Conference associated with works by Shanley, Lee Blessing and Richard Dresser. His Hudson Guild production of Lee Kalcheim's Breakfast with Les and Bess had a long run at the Lambs Theatre. Other notable premieres include plays by Israel Horovitz and Donald Margulies. He is a past board member of the Society of Directors and Choreographers.

== Film and television ==
Kellman got his start in the early 1980s as a director for soap operas such as the NBC-TV daytime soap opera series Another World and CBS's As the World Turns.

He directed the Showtime adaptation of the long-running Broadway play Gemini and the CBS special Orphans, Waifs and Wards. He made his feature film directorial debut in 1985 with the 20th Century Fox screen adaptation of Key Exchange, which starred Brooke Adams and Ben Masters.

An opportunity to direct the pilot episodes of half-hour TV comedies brought Kellman to Los Angeles. In his first pilot season he mounted pilots starring George Segal, Oprah Winfrey, Patti LuPone and Kenneth McMillan. His second pilot season brought success when his pilots of The Robert Guillaume Show and Murphy Brown were picked up as series. In 1999, Kellman directed the Murphy Brown finale episode, "Never Can Say Goodbye". He won Emmy Awards in 1990 and 1992 for his work.

Kellman directed fifty pilots, half of which went to series, launching long runs such as NBC's Mad About You, Suddenly Susan, and George Lopez. He also worked on CBS's Designing Women, Felicity, E.R., Ally McBeal, My Boys and 8 Simple Rules.

He went on to direct the 1992 Hollywood Pictures film Straight Talk starring Dolly Parton as a sultry, wise-cracking DJ, and the Tri-Star release Slappy and the Stinkers for Sony Pictures in 1998. In 2000, he directed the ABC television movie Mary and Rhoda, reuniting Mary Tyler Moore and Valerie Harper.

When Murphy Brown returned to the CBS schedule for an eleventh season in 2018, Kellman returned to direct the season finale.

== Teaching career ==
In 2008, during a Writers Guild strike, Kellman joined the film faculties of the American Film Institute and the University of Southern California (USC). In 2011, he was awarded tenure at USC and co-founded the school's groundbreaking comedy program, USC Comedy at the School of Cinematic Arts. In 2017, USC named him inaugural holder of its Robin Williams Endowed Chair in Comedy.

== Awards and nominations ==
- Primetime Emmy Award: Outstanding Direction of a Comedy Series, Murphy Brown, 1992
- Primetime Emmy Award: Best Comedy, Murphy Brown – Producer, 1990
- Directors Guild Award: Outstanding Direction of a Comedy, Murphy Brown, 1989
- Monitor Award: Best Director, Pepsi – To The Victors, 1985
- Primetime Emmy Nomination: Outstanding Direction of a Comedy Series, Murphy Brown, 1991
- Primetime Emmy Nomination: Outstanding Direction of a Comedy Series, Murphy Brown, 1990
- Directors Guild Nomination: Outstanding Direction of a Comedy Series, Murphy Brown, 1990
- Emmy Nomination: Outstanding Direction of a Comedy Series, Murphy Brown, 1989
- Viewers for Quality Television Award, 1989
- Media Access Award, 1989
- Directors Guild Nomination: Outstanding Direction of a Comedy Series, Murphy Brown, 1988
- Primetime Emmy Nomination: Outstanding Direction of a Comedy Series, Murphy Brown, 1988
- Daytime Emmy Nomination: Best Direction, Another World, 1981

== Selected filmography ==
=== Director ===
- Samantha Who?
- Notes from the Underbelly
- Four Kings
- Living with Fran
- George Lopez
- Alias
- Mary and Rhoda
- Felicity
- Good Advice
- Murphy Brown
- ER
- Bless This House
- Slappy and the Stinkers
- Mad About You
- Straight Talk
- Designing Women
- Another World
- True Jackson, VP
