= Paul Michael =

American actor

- Michael in 2011
- Born: August 15, 1926; Providence, Rhode Island, U.S.
- Died: July 8, 2011 (aged 84); Woodland Hills, California, U.S.
- Occupation: Actor
- Years active: 1956–2006
- Spouse: Marion Ross (m. 1988)
- Children: 2

Paul Michael (August 15, 1926 – July 8, 2011) was an American actor. He was a regular guest star on American television appearing in Kojak, Hill Street Blues, Alias and Frasier. He also played King Johnny Romano on Dark Shadows. He was also in movies such as Mask of the Red Death and the TV movie Where There's a Will. He was best known for his appearances on Broadway where he frequently played the title role in Zorba the Greek, Tevye in Fiddler on the Roof, and the barber in Man of La Mancha. He danced in Tovarich with Vivien Leigh on Broadway in 1963.

== Personal life ==
Michael was born in Providence, Rhode Island, to Lebanese parents. He began singing at a young age in school productions. He served as a sergeant in the Army in the South Pacific during World War II. After the war he went to college, funded by the G.I. Bill, receiving a B.A. in English literature from Brown University. He was married for 23 years to actress Marion Ross, his third wife, and had three sons.

== Death ==
Michael died from heart failure on July 8, 2011, at his home in Woodland Hills, California, at the age of 84.

== Filmography ==
=== Film ===
Year	Title	Role	Notes
1940	Escape to Glory	German Sailor #2	
1942	Blue, White and Perfect	Felix	Uncredited
1942	Joan of Paris	German Captain	Uncredited
1970	House of Dark Shadows	King of the Gypsies	
1981	Pennies from Heaven	Bank Teller #5	
1989	Masque of the Red Death	Benito	
1994	Judicial Consent	Ramirez	
2002	The Streetsweeper	Enzo Morelli	

=== Television ===
Year	Title	Role	Notes
1976–1977	Muggsy	Gus	13 episodes
