= The Iceman Cometh =

1939 play by Eugene O'Neill

- Original language: English
- Written by: Eugene O'Neill
- Genre: Tragedy
- Setting: 1912, Harry Hope's Saloon in New York

Premiere
- Date: October 9, 1946
- Place: Martin Beck Theatre; New York City

The Iceman Cometh is a play written by American playwright Eugene O'Neill in 1939. First published in 1946, the play premiered on Broadway at the Martin Beck Theatre on October 9, 1946, directed by Eddie Dowling, where it ran for 136 performances before closing on March 15, 1947. It has subsequently been adapted for the screen multiple times. The work tells the story of a number of alcoholic dead-enders who live together in a flop house above a saloon and what happens to them when the most outwardly "successful" of them embraces sobriety.

New York Times theater critic Brooks Atkinson, at the beginning of the telecast of Sidney Lumet's 1960 television adaptation of The Iceman Cometh, called it "a harsh and ruthless drama.... It is one of America's greatest plays" 14 years after it opened to mixed reviews on Broadway. Many years later, the 1999 Broadway revival, based on a 1998 London production starring Kevin Spacey as Hickey, was staged at the Brooks Atkinson Theatre.

During a press conference before the 1946 opening of the stage play, O'Neill said that he believed the secret to happiness was contained within one sentence, quoted from Mark 8:36: "What shall it profit a man if he shall gain the whole world and lose his own soul?"

== Characters ==
- Harry Hope: Widowed proprietor of the saloon and rooming house where the play takes place. He has a tendency to give free drinks, though he constantly says otherwise
- Ed Mosher: Hope's brother-in-law (brother of Hope's late wife Bess), a con-man and former circus man
- Pat McGloin: Former police lieutenant who was convicted on criminal charges and kicked off the force
- Willie Oban: Harvard Law School alumnus
- Joe Mott: Former proprietor of a gambling house
- General Piet Wetjoen: Former leader of a Boer commando
- Captain Cecil Lewis: Former Captain of British infantry
- James "Jimmy Tomorrow" Cameron: Former Boer War correspondent who is constantly daydreaming about getting his old job back again tomorrow (hence his nickname)
- Hugo Kalmar: Former editor of anarchist periodicals who often quotes the Old Testament
- Larry Slade: Former syndicalist-anarchist
- Rocky Pioggi: Night bartender, who is paid little and makes his living mostly by allowing Pearl and Margie to stay at the bar in exchange for a substantial cut of the money they make from prostitution, although he despises being called a pimp
- Don Parritt: Teenage son of a former anarchist
- Pearl: Streetwalker working for Rocky
- Margie: Streetwalker working for Rocky
- Cora: Streetwalker, Chuck's girlfriend
- Chuck Morello: Day bartender, Cora's boyfriend
- Theodore "Hickey" Hickman: Hardware salesman
- Moran: Police detective
- Lieb: Police detective

== Plot summary ==
The Iceman Cometh is set in New York in 1912 in Harry Hope's downmarket Greenwich Village saloon and rooming house. The patrons, twelve men and three prostitutes, are dead-end alcoholics who spend every possible moment seeking oblivion in one another's company and trying to con or wheedle free drinks from Harry and the bartenders. They drift purposelessly from day to day, coming fully alive only during the semi-annual visits of salesman Theodore "Hickey" Hickman. When Hickey finishes a tour of his business territory, which is apparently a wide expanse of the East Coast, he typically turns up at the saloon and starts the party. As the play opens, the regulars are expecting Hickey to arrive in time for Harry's birthday party. The first act introduces the various characters as they bicker among themselves, showing how drunk and delusional they are, all the while awaiting Hickey.

Joe Mott insists that he will soon re-open his gambling casino. The English Cecil "The Captain" Lewis and South African Boer Piet "The General" Wetjoen, who fought each other during the Boer War, are now good friends, and both insist that they'll soon return to their nations of origin. Harry Hope has not left the bar since his wife Bess's death 20 years ago. He promises that he'll walk around the neighborhood on his birthday, which is the next day. Pat McGloin says he hopes to be reinstated into the police force, but is waiting for the right moment. Ed Mosher prides himself on his ability to give incorrect change, but he kept too much of his illegitimate profits to himself and was fired from the circus; he says he will get his job back someday. Hugo Kalmar, a former anarchist, is drunk and passed out for most of the play; when he is conscious, he pesters the other patrons to buy him a drink. Chuck Morello says that he will marry Cora tomorrow. Larry Slade is a former syndicalist-anarchist who looks pityingly on the rest. Don Parritt is the son of a former anarchist who shows up early in the play to talk about his mother (Larry's ex-girlfriend) to Larry; specifically her arrest due to her involvement in the anarchist movement.

When Hickey finally arrives, his changed behavior throws the characters into turmoil. With as much charisma as ever, he insists that he sees life clearly now as never before because he no longer drinks. Hickey wants the characters to cast away their delusions and accept that their heavy drinking and inaction mean that their hopes will never be fulfilled. He takes on this task with a near-maniacal fervor. How he goes about his mission, how the other characters respond, and their efforts to find out what has wrought this change in him, take over four hours to resolve. During and after Harry's birthday party, most seem to have been affected by Hickey's ramblings. Larry who says he's done with active participation in life and is content to be a spectator "in the grandstand" pretends to be unaffected, but when Don reveals he was the informant responsible for the arrest of his own mother (Larry's former girlfriend), Larry angrily insists he doesn't want to hear it. Willie the former lawyer proposes that he'll represent McGloin in his appeal to get his old police job back as a way to brush up his own lawyering skills before he tries to get back his old job with the district attorney, and Rocky admits he is a pimp, not a bartender.

Most of the men Hickey talked with do go out into the world—dressed up, hopeful of turning their lives around—but they fail to make any progress. Eventually, they return and are jolted by a sudden revelation. Hickey, who had earlier told the other characters first that his wife had died and then that she was shot and then that she was murdered, admits that he is the one who killed her. The police arrive, called by Hickey himself, to arrest Hickey. Hickey tries to explain his murder of the woman he loved so deeply in a long dramatic monologue, saying that he did it out of love for her. He relates that his father was a preacher in the backwoods of Indiana. Evidently he was both charismatic and persuasive, and it was his inheriting these traits which led Hickey to become a salesman. An angry kid trapped in a small town, Hickey had no use for anyone but his sweetheart, Evelyn. Evelyn's family forbade her to associate with Hickey, but she ignored them. After Hickey left to become a salesman, he promised he would marry Evelyn as soon as he was able. He became a successful salesman, then sent for her and the two were very happy until Hickey became increasingly guilty following his wife's constant forgiveness of his infidelities and drinking. He then recounts how he murdered her to free her from the pain of his persistent philandering and drinking because she loved him too much to live apart from him. But, in retelling the murder, he laughs and tells Evelyn, "Well, you know what you can do with that pipe dream now, don't you?" In realizing he said this, Hickey breaks down completely. He says that he must have been insane and that people need their empty dreams to keep existing. The others are now relieved that what Hickey had been telling them all throughout the play, which had made them all face the truth about themselves, was just the ravings of a lunatic, and so they could now safely resume believing their old "pipe dreams" and excuses about themselves and resume drinking and their old lives hanging out in Harry Hope's bar. They reaffirm their solidarity with Hickey and pledge to testify to his insanity at his murder trial, despite Hickey's desire for a death sentence. He no longer wishes to live now that he has no illusions about life.

They return to their empty promises and pipe dreams except for Parritt, who runs to his room and jumps off the fire escape, unable to live with the knowledge of what he has done to his mother after discarding the last of his lies about his action and motivation for it. He first claims that he did it due to patriotism and then for money, but finally admits he did it because he hated his mother, who was so obsessed with her own freedom of action that she became self-centered and alternately ignored or dominated him. Despite witnessing the young man's fatal leap, and acknowledging the futility of his own situation, as Larry says at the end, "Be God, there's no hope! I'll never be a success in the grandstand— or anywhere else! Life is too much for me! I'll be a weak fool looking with pity at the two sides of everything till the day I die!"

== Development ==
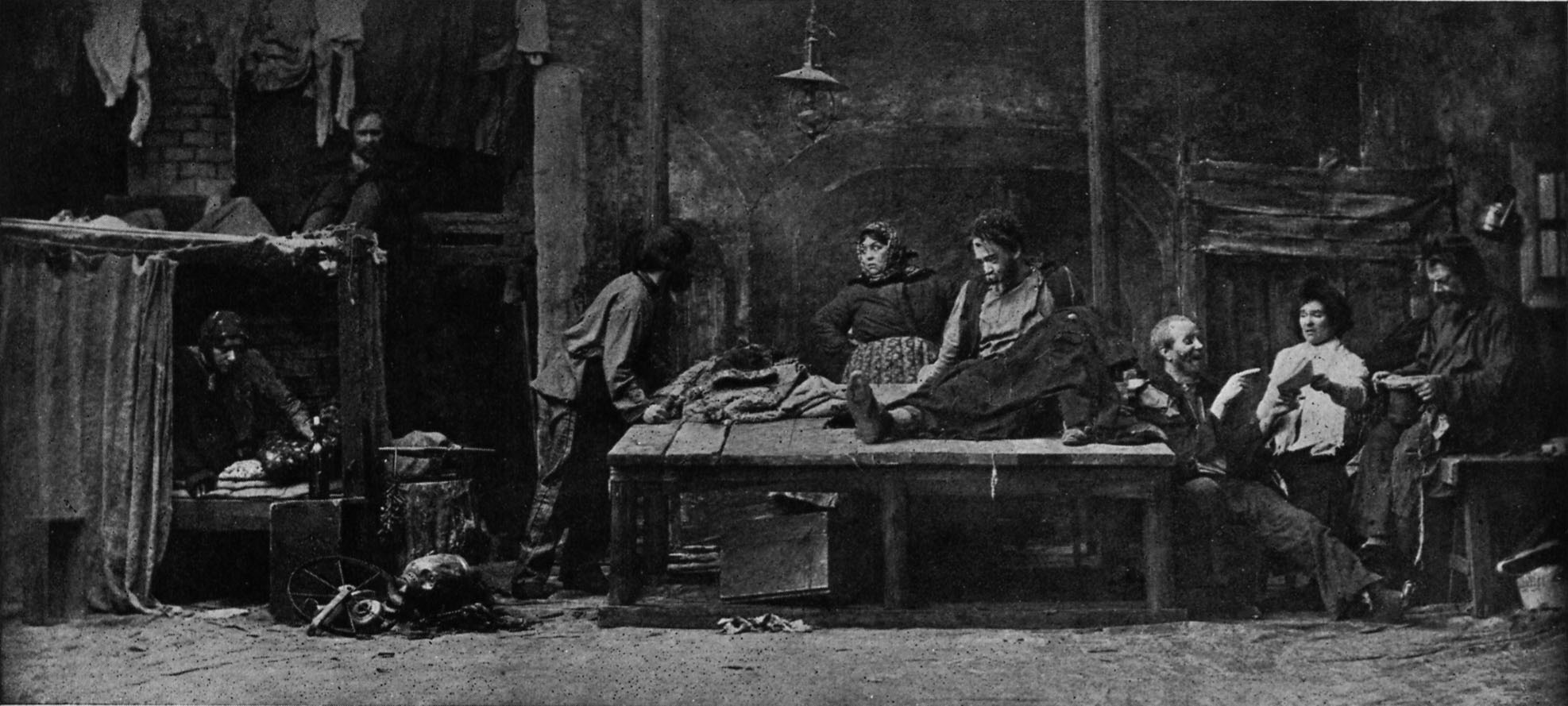
The Lower Depths, a possible inspiration for The Iceman Cometh

Emma Goldman, whom O'Neill admired, inspired the play's anarchist subplot. The Iceman Cometh is often compared to Maxim Gorky's The Lower Depths, which may have been O'Neill's inspiration for his play.

James Barton, in his performance as Hickey, was reportedly not up to the massive emotional and physical demands of such a titanic part, and sometimes forgot his lines or wore out his voice.

Marlon Brando was offered the part of Don Parritt in the original Broadway production, but turned it down. Brando was able to read only a few pages of the script the producers gave him before falling asleep, and he later argued at length with the producers, describing the play as "ineptly written and poorly constructed" in the hopes they would explain what the play was about and not discover that he had not read it.

== Stage productions ==
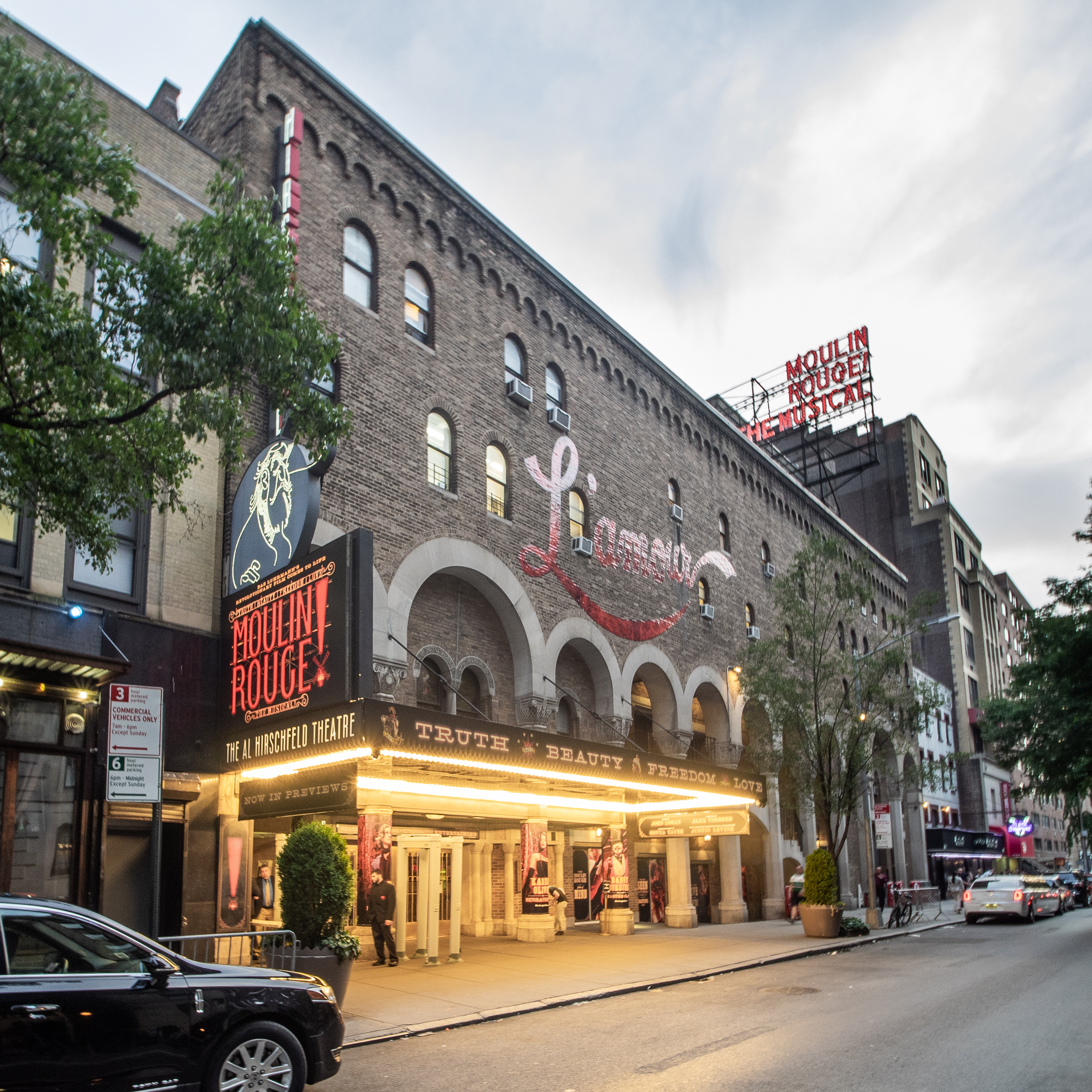
The Al Hirschfeld Theatre, then the Martin Beck Theatre, where the original production ran from 1946 to 47

1947: The original production was staged at the Martin Beck Theatre and opened on October 9, 1946, and closed on March 15, 1947, after 136 performances. It was directed by Eddie Dowling with production and lighting design by Robert Edmond Jones. The cast starred James Barton (Theodore "Hickey" Hickman), Jeanne Cagney (Margie), Leo Chalzel (Hugo Kalmar), Russell Collins (James "Jimmy Tomorrow" Cameron), Paul Crabtree (Don Parritt), Dudley Digges (Harry Hope), Ruth Gilbert (Pearl), Charles Hart (Lieb), Nicholas Joy (Cecil "The Captain" Lewis), Marcella Markham (Cora), Joe Marr (Chuck Morello), John Marriott (Joe Mott), E. G. Marshall (Willie Oban), Al McGranary (Pat McGloin), Tom Pedi (Rocky Pioggi), Carl Benton Reid (Larry Slade), Morton L. Stevens (Ed Mosher), Frank Tweddell (Piet "The General" Wetjoen), and Michael Wyler (Moran). The play received mixed reviews.

1956: An Off-Broadway production staged after O'Neill's death featured Jason Robards as Hickey, Peter Falk as Rocky Pioggi, and was directed by José Quintero. This production was an unqualified success and established the play as a great modern tragedy.

1973: A Broadway revival staged at the Circle in the Square Theatre ran from December 13, 1973, to February 16, 1974, with James Earl Jones as Hickey.

1985: A Broadway revival staged at the Lunt-Fontanne Theatre featured Jason Robards as Hickey with a cast that included Barnard Hughes as Harry Hope, Donald Moffat as Larry Slade, and again directed by José Quintero. It ran from September 29, 1985, to December 1, 1985.

1990: Chicago's Goodman Theatre mounted a production directed by Robert Falls, starring Brian Dennehy as Hickey, Jerome Kilty as Hope and James Cromwell as Slade.

1998: A London production featuring Kevin Spacey had a successful and critically acclaimed run through 1998 and 1999 at the Almeida Theatre and the Old Vic in London.

1999: A Broadway revival from the 1998 London production staged at the Brooks Atkinson Theatre with Kevin Spacey as Hickey. It ran from April 8, 1999, to July 17, 1999.

2012: A revival at Chicago's Goodman Theatre featured Nathan Lane in the lead role of Hickey, Brian Dennehy this time as Larry Slade, and was directed by Robert Falls. It started its run at the Goodman Theatre in April 2012, slated for a six-week engagement. It was a huge success for the Goodman Theater, whose management stated it was the most successful production in its history. This production omitted the character of Pat McGloin.

2015: The Goodman Theatre production directed by Falls, starring Lane and Dennehy and the rest of the original cast with the creative team from Chicago was produced at the Harvey Theater of the Brooklyn Academy of Music with a six-week engagement starting on February 5, 2015, that featured Nathan Lane and John Douglas Thompson. For his performance, Thompson won an Obie Award.

2018: Denzel Washington starred as Hickey and Tammy Blanchard as Cora, in a Broadway revival directed by George C. Wolfe. The production ran for 14 weeks at the Bernard B. Jacobs Theatre, beginning in previews on March 23, 2018, and opening officially on April 26. The cast featured Frank Wood as Cecil Lewis, Bill Irwin as Ed Mosher, Reg Rogers as James Cameron, Colm Meaney as Harry Hope, David Morse as Larry Slade, and Austin Butler as Don Parritt. The sets were by Santo Loquasto, costumes by Ann Roth, and lighting design by Jules Fisher and Peggy Eisenhauer.

== Adaptations ==
1960: TV Production for Play of the Week on the National Telefilm Associates (NTA) syndication network, directed by Sidney Lumet. This production featured Jason Robards as Hickey, Tom Pedi from the original 1947 stage production as Rocky Pioggi, Sorrell Booke as Hugo Kalmar, and Robert Redford as Don Parritt. It is presented as two separate episodes of the series due to the length of the work, with a total run time of 210 minutes. It is notable in view of TV standards of the time that while much dialog was omitted for time, that which was retained was not changed to soften its language. For example, at the end of Hickey's breakdown, Robards says the words "that damned bitch" exactly as O'Neill had written.

1973: A film adaptation as part of the American Film Theatre directed by John Frankenheimer. This production featured many well known actors including Lee Marvin as Hickey, Fredric March as Harry Hope, Robert Ryan as Larry Slade, Tom Pedi as Rocky Pioggi, Bradford Dillman as Willie Oban, Sorrell Booke as Hugo Kalmar, Martyn Green as Cecil Lewis, Moses Gunn as Joe Mott, George Voskovec as The General (Piet Wetjoen) and Jeff Bridges as Don Parritt. This film was the final film appearance of Fredric March, Robert Ryan and Martyn Green. The film run time is 239 minutes. Dialog was consistently trimmed for time as might be done for a stage production. The character of Ed Mosher was excised entirely. There are some variations in words or word order in ordinary speech that differ from the published text. The most important speeches are present and usually performed in full from the published text. Some segments of dialog are presented in an order that differs from the published text.

2020: The Iceman Cometh was broadcast as a two-part Zoom Premiere on YouTube Live as a benefit for the Actors Fund. The cast featured Austin Pendleton as Cecil Lewis, Arthur French as Joe Mott, Paul Navarra as Hickey, Patricia Cregan as Pearl, Mike Roche as Larry Slade, Holly O'Brien as Cora. Marygrace Navarra was the stage manager. The event was produced by Caroline Grace Productions, in association with the 2020 Theatre Company. The event was a benefit for the Actors Fund during the COVID-19 pandemic of 2020.

== Notable performers ==
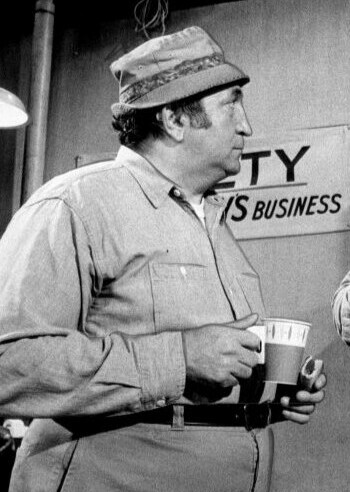
Tom Pedi, here seen in Arnie, was the original Rocky and portrayed the character in both the TV adaptation and the film adaptation.

- Jason Robards played the role of Hickey in multiple stage productions and the 1960 TV adaptation.
- Tom Pedi played the role of Rocky the bartender in the original 1947 stage production, the 1960 TV adaptation and the 1973 film adaptation.
- Sorrell Booke played the role of Hugo Kalmar in both the 1960 TV adaptation and the 1973 film adaptation.
- Robert Redford played the role of Don Parritt in the 1960 TV adaptation.
- James Earl Jones played the role of Hickey in the 1973 Broadway production.
- Jeff Bridges played the role of Don Parritt in the 1973 film adaptation and Lee Marvin played Hickey.
- Barnard Hughes played the role of Harry Hope in the 1985 Broadway production.
- Tony Danza played the role of Rocky the bartender in the 1999 Broadway production.
- Paul Giamatti played the role of Jimmy Tomorrow in the 1999 Broadway production.
- Kevin Spacey played the role of Hickey in the 1999 Broadway and London Old Vic Productions.
- Nathan Lane played the role of Hickey and Brian Dennehy played Larry Slade in the 2012 Goodman Theater production, which was revived in 2015 at BAM.
- Denzel Washington played the role of Hickey in the 2018 Broadway production.
- Austin Butler played the role of Don Parritt in the 2018 Broadway production.
- Bill Irwin played the role of Ed Mosher in the 2018 Broadway production.

== Reception ==
The critic Pauline Kael called The Iceman Cometh the "greatest thesis play of the American theater" and mentions that O'Neill has a "crude, prosaic virtuosity, which is also pure American poetry".

== Awards and nominations ==
=== Original Broadway production ===
Year	Award ceremony	Category	Nominee	Result
1947	New York Drama Critics' Circle Award	Best American Play	Eugene O'Neill	Nominated

=== 1973 Broadway revival ===
Year	Award ceremony	Category	Nominee	Result
1974	Drama Desk Award	Outstanding Costume Design	Carrie F. Robbins	Won

=== 1985 Broadway revival ===
Year	Award ceremony	Category	Nominee	Result
1986	Tony Award	Best Revival		Nominated
1986	Tony Award	Best Direction of a Play	José Quintero	Nominated
1986	Tony Award	Best Scenic Design	Ben Edwards	Nominated
1986	Tony Award	Best Lighting Design	Thomas R. Skelton	Nominated
1986	Drama Desk Award	Outstanding Revival		Nominated
1986	Drama Desk Award	Outstanding Featured Actor in a Play	Donald Moffat	Nominated
1986	Drama Desk Award	Outstanding Costume Design	Jane Greenwood	Nominated

=== 1999 Broadway revival ===
Year	Award ceremony	Category	Nominee	Result
1999	Tony Award	Best Revival of a Play		Nominated
1999	Tony Award	Best Performance by a Leading Actor in a Play	Kevin Spacey	Nominated
1999	Tony Award	Best Direction of a Play	Howard Davies	Nominated
1999	Tony Award	Best Scenic Design	Bob Crowley	Nominated
1999	Tony Award	Best Lighting Design	Mark Henderson	Nominated
1999	Drama Desk Award	Drama Desk Award for Outstanding Revival of a Play		Won
1999	Drama Desk Award	Outstanding Featured Actor in a Play	Paul Giamatti	Nominated
1999	Drama Desk Award	Outstanding Director of a Play	Howard Davies	Nominated
1999	Outer Critics Circle Award	Outstanding Revival of a Play		Won
1999	Outer Critics Circle Award	Outstanding Actor in a Play	Kevin Spacey	Won
1999	Outer Critics Circle Award	Outstanding Featured Actor in a Play	Tim Pigott-Smith	Nominated
1999	Outer Critics Circle Award	Outstanding Featured Actor in a Play	Michael Emerson	Nominated
1999	Outer Critics Circle Award	Outstanding Director of a Play	Howard Davies	Won
1999	Outer Critics Circle Award	Outstanding Set Design	Bob Crowley	Nominated
1999	Outer Critics Circle Award	Outstanding Costume Design	Bob Crowley	Nominated
1999	Outer Critics Circle Award	Outstanding Lighting Design	Mark Henderson	Nominated
1999	Drama League Award	Distinguished Revival of a Play		Nominated
1999	Theatre World Award		Clarke Peters	Won

=== 2018 Broadway revival ===
Year	Award Ceremony	Category	Nominee	Result
2018	Tony Award	Best Revival of a Play		Nominated
2018	Tony Award	Best Performance by an Actor in a Leading Role in a Play	Denzel Washington	Nominated
2018	Tony Award	Best Performance by an Actor in a Featured Role in a Play	David Morse	Nominated
2018	Tony Award	Best Direction of a Play	George C. Wolfe	Nominated
2018	Tony Award	Best Scenic Design	Santo Loquasto	Nominated
2018	Tony Award	Best Costume Design of a Play	Ann Roth	Nominated
2018	Tony Award	Best Lighting Design of a Play	Jules Fisher and Peggy Eisenhauer	Nominated
2018	Tony Award	Best Sound Design of a Play	Dan Moses Schreier	Nominated
2018	Drama League Award	Outstanding Revival of a Broadway or Off-Broadway Play		Nominated
2018	Drama League Award	Distinguished Performance Award	Denzel Washington	Nominated
2018	Outer Critics Circle Award	Outstanding Featured Actor in a Play	David Morse	Nominated
2018	Drama Desk Award	Outstanding Featured Actor in a Play	David Morse	Nominated

== See also ==
- Raines law

== Bibliography ==
- Meyer, Evelyn S. (1989). "Honoring Eugene O'Neill (1888–1953): A Centennial Review of Literature". Reference Services Review. 17 (1): 33–41. doi:10.1108/eb049045. ISSN 0090-7324.
