= Walter Willison =

American stage actor (born 1947)

- Born: June 24, 1947 (age 78); Monterey Park, California, USA
- Years active: 1968–present
- Awards: Tony Award nomination (1971); Theatre World Award (1971); A Special William Inge Award (1987)

Walter Willison (born June 24, 1947) is an American stage actor.

== Career ==
He starred on Broadway in Norman, Is That You?, Two By Two, Pippin (as Pippin), Wild and Wonderful, Grand Hotel, A Christmas Carol at Madison Square Garden, and as The Celebrant in Leonard Bernstein's Mass at The Kennedy Center. Willison has starred in regional productions of Carousel Carnival!, Two By Two, Oklahoma!, South Pacific, Fiddler on the Roof, On a Clear Day You Can See Forever, Your Own Thing, and as El Gallo in the First International Tour of The Fantasticks in Japan.

Willison has also performed on television, on the NBC soap opera Days of Our Lives and he starred in the 1976 NBC Saturday morning family sitcom, McDuff, the Talking Dog. His films include Ziegfeld: The Man and His Women, Harry and Walter Go To New York, Fantasies, and with an All Star cast of theatrical legends in Rick McKay's film Broadway: Beyond the Golden Age (2020). He starred in The Rattlestick Theater's streaming musical Gen Speak: Love Songs, and he is a guest star on the streaming TV series Sami starring Cindy Williams on Amazon Prime.

Willison has directed productions around the United States, from San Diego's Old Globe Theater to Off-Broadway, and in cabarets and nightclubs. He conceived and directed Grand Hotel: The 25th Anniversary Reunion Concert starring Liliane Montevecchi and members of the original Broadwat cast, at 54 Below in 2015, conceived, wrote and directed Martin Charnin's The 1977 Annie Christmas TV Special: Live in Concert costarring with Shelly Burch and members of the original Broadway and TV cast at The Cutting Room, and Grand Hotel: The 30th Anniversary Celebration in Concert, benefitting the Actors Fund, directing and costarring with Broadway cast members John Schneider and Karen Akers, and Sachi Parker in 2019. He came full circle when he conceived, directed and starred as Noah opposite Tony Award winner Karen Ziemba in "Two By Two: The 50th Anniversary Virtual Concert" benefitting the Actors Fund, a streaming production of the musical which premiered on New Year's Day of 2021.

== Awards ==
He received a Tony Award nomination and Theatre World Award for his Broadway musical debut in Richard Rodgers' and Martin Charnin's Biblical musical Two by Two.
