= Holly O'Brien =

American actress and singer

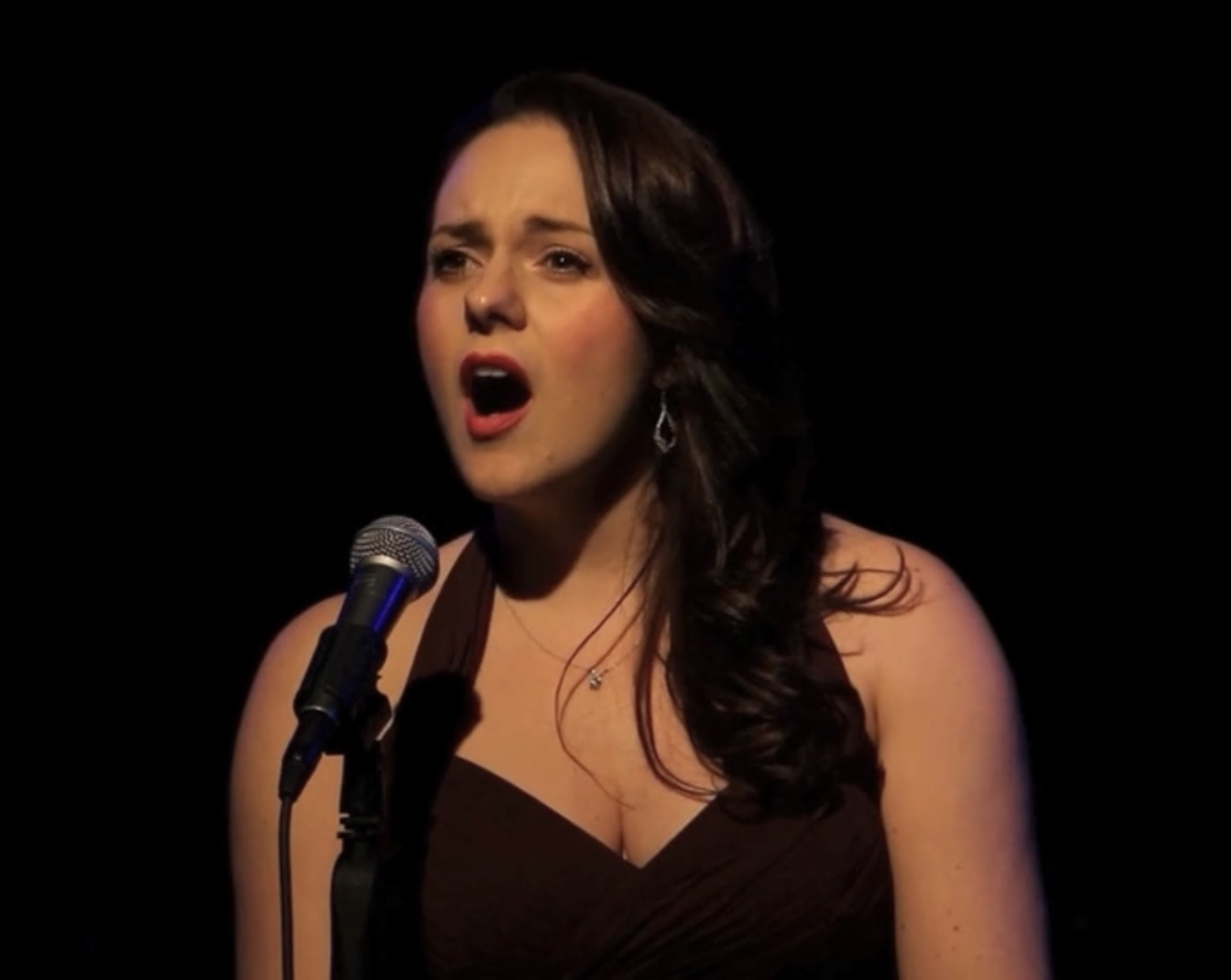
- Holly O'Brien performing at The Triad Theatre in New York City
- Education: Interlochen Arts Academy; The Hartt School (BFA); Westminster Choir College at Rider University (MVP)
- Occupations: Actress, singer
- Spouse: Mike Roche (m. 2016)
- Website: www.hollyobrien.com

Holly O'Brien is an American actress and singer. She played the role of Goldie in Tony Award Winner Martin Charnin's World Premiere of his new production of Two by Two and performed the role of Belle multiple times in Disney's musical Beauty and the Beast. She played Loretta in the original Off-Broadway cast of the concert revival of Love from Judy (with a score by Hugh Martin) with the Obie Award winning company Musicals Tonight! in New York City.

== Early life and education ==
O'Brien was born in Roseburg, Oregon. A classically trained soprano, she is a graduate of the Interlochen Arts Academy in Interlochen, Michigan, where she studied opera, voice, and theatre. She received her Bachelor of Fine Arts degree in musical theatre from The Hartt School, the performing arts conservatory, at the University of Hartford in West Hartford, Connecticut. and her Master's Degree in Voice Pedagogy from Westminster Choir College at Rider University

== Career ==
O'Brien was cast and directed by Tony Award winner Martin Charnin in the role of Goldie in the World Premiere of the new version of Two by Two by Richard Rodgers and Martin Charnin at the Cumberland County Playhouse.

She played the role of Belle in Disney's musical Beauty and the Beast in the first regional production of the musical at the Cumberland County Playhouse. She then played the role of Belle again at the Merry Go Round Playhouse and also at the Arkansas Repertory Theatre.

O'Brien performed the role of Marilyn Monroe / Norma Jean in Norma Jean Enlightened at the Drama Book Shop's 50th Anniversary Tribute to Marilyn Monroe in New York City. She received the best actress award for her work in the role of Marilyn Monroe / Norma Jean in Norma Jean Enlightened at the Midwinter Theatre Festival in New York City.

O'Brien played Loretta in the original Off-Broadway cast of the concert revival of Love from Judy (with a score by Hugh Martin). Love from Judy was produced by the 2004 Obie Award Winning Company Musicals Tonight! at the Sol Goldman 14th Street YMHA Theatre in New York City.

O'Brien performed as a soprano soloist in Vienna, Austria at the Wiener Musikseminar.

She performed the role of Luisa (The Girl) in The Fantasticks at the Penobscot Theatre and the role of Cindy Lou in The Marvelous Wonderettes at the Merry Go Round Playhouse.

In 2016, she played Peggy in the revival of The Taffetas at the Seven Angels Theatre.

O'Brien performed the role of Cora in Eugene O'Neill's The Iceman Cometh in the two part Zoom Premiere on YouTube Live as a benefit for The Actors Fund during the COVID-19 pandemic in 2020.

== Personal life ==
O'Brien married actor Mike Roche in New York City in August 2016.
