= Mike Roche =

American actor

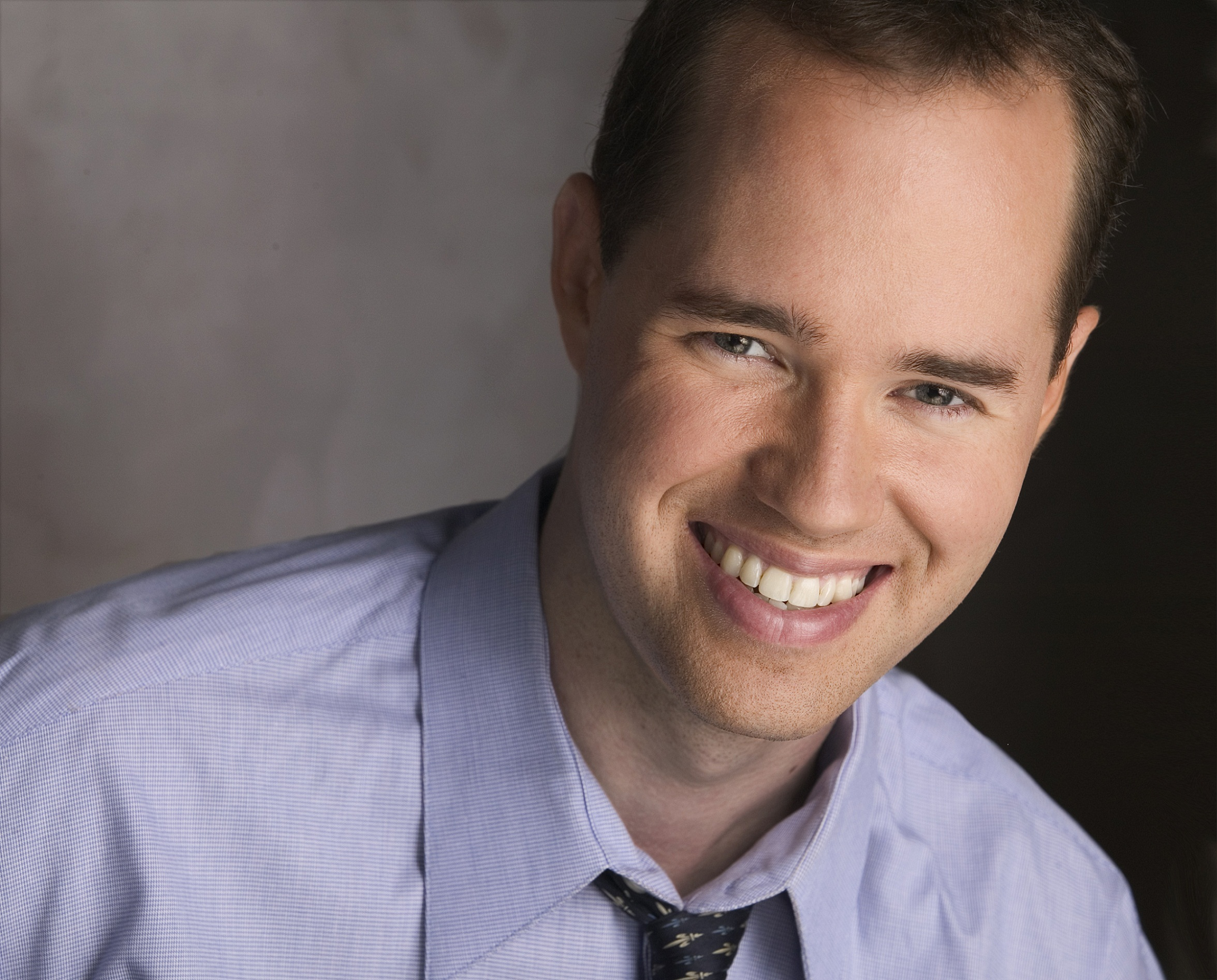
- Born: September 23; Pascack Valley, New Jersey, U.S.
- Education: Ramapo College (BA)
- Occupation: Actor
- Spouse: Holly O'Brien (m. 2016)
- Website: mikeroche.net

Mike Roche (born September 23 in Pascack Valley, New Jersey) is an American actor of film, stage and television.

Roche played Humphrey James in the 2007 Off-Broadway revival of Night Over Taos by Maxwell Anderson, directed by Academy Award winner Estelle Parsons at the Theatre for the New City in New York City. The show was produced by INTAR Theatre (Eduardo Machado, Artistic Director).

== Early life and education ==
Roche was raised in Bergenfield, New Jersey, and is a graduate of Bergenfield High School.

He earned a Bachelor of Arts degree in literature with a minor in political science from Ramapo College, located in Mahwah, New Jersey. He is an Eagle Scout and while at Ramapo College he played baseball and received the college's Dean's Award for "Exceptional Service to the Campus Community".

== Career ==
=== Stage work ===
Roche played the role of Droog Pete in the 2004–2005 New York City theatrical production of the play A Clockwork Orange by Anthony Burgess at the Ensemble Studio Theatre and 59E59 Theaters and played Faber in the 2006 New York City theatrical premiere of Fahrenheit 451 by Ray Bradbury at 59E59 Theaters. The productions were both directed by Joe Tantalo and were produced by Tantalo's Drama Desk Award-winning Godlight Theatre Company.

He performed in both A Clockwork Orange and Fahrenheit 451 when they transferred from New York City to the Edinburgh Festival Fringe in Scotland.

Roche played Humphrey James in the 2007 Off-Broadway revival of Night Over Taos by Maxwell Anderson, directed by Estelle Parsons at the Theatre for the New City in New York City. The show was produced by INTAR Theatre (Eduardo Machado, artistic director).

He is a member of the 2010 Drama Desk Special Award–winning Godlight Theatre Company ("consistent originality and excellence in dramatizing modern literature, and especially for the vibrant theatricality of its innovative productions.").

Roche played Father Flynn in the first New York revival of John Patrick Shanley's Tony Award–winning play Doubt: A Parable in October 2012.

In 2020, he performed the role of Larry Slade in Eugene O'Neill's play The Iceman Cometh in the two-part Zoom premiere on YouTube Live as a benefit performance for the Actors Fund during the COVID-19 pandemic of 2020.

Roche performed the role of the Husband in Clark Kee's adaptation of Arthur Schnitzler's play La Ronde (Reigen) entitled Round Dance. The production was performed at the IRT Theatre in New York City in 2022.

He played the role of Judge Brack in an updated version of Henrik Ibsen's play Hedda Gabler, directed and adapted by Robert Greer, at the Theatre for the New City with the August Strindberg Repertory Theatre.

In 2023, Roche performed the role of Gustav in a new production of August Strindberg's play Creditors at the Theatre for the New City with the August Strindberg Repertory Theatre, directed and adapted by Robert Greer.

Roche played the role of the longshoreman Meathead in the American premiere of an adaptation of Arthur Miller's screenplay The Hook, adapted by Ron Hutchinson and directed by Claire Beckman at the Waterfront Museum Barge in Red Hook, Brooklyn, with the Brave New World Repertory Theatre in 2023.

== Personal life ==
Roche married actress and singer Holly O'Brien on August 28, 2016, in New York City.

He is a black belt in taekwondo. and a blue belt in Brazilian jiu-jitsu under Marcelo Garcia.
