= Dream Lover (1986 film) =

1986 film by Alan J. Pakula

- Theatrical release poster
- Directed by: Alan J. Pakula
- Written by: Jon Boorstin
- Produced by: Jon Boorstin
- Starring: Kristy McNichol; Ben Masters; Paul Shenar
- Cinematography: Sven Nykvist
- Edited by: Angelo Corrao; Trudy Ship
- Music by: Michael Small
- Production company: Metro-Goldwyn-Mayer
- Distributed by: MGM/UA Entertainment Co.
- Release dates: January 1986 (Avoriaz Fantasy Film Festival); February 28, 1986
- Running time: 104 minutes
- Country: United States
- Language: English
- Box office: $502,237

Dream Lover is a 1986 American thriller film about a woman who undergoes sleep deprivation therapy after being attacked in her apartment - with unexpected results. The film was directed by Alan J. Pakula, and stars Kristy McNichol, Ben Masters, and Joseph Culp.

== Synopsis ==
While sleeping, musician Kathy Gardner has romantic fantasies about herself and her boyfriend Kevin McCann. Kevin admires her penchant for flute playing, and invites Kathy to front his jazz band. However, she's slated to visit Japan with her father Ben.

At a local theater, Kathy mentions Kevin's offer to Ben. Ben's friend Claire urges Kathy to accept the offer; she mentions Kathy's late alcoholic mother, who had a turbulent relationship with Ben. Kathy's father agrees that she should join Kevin's band. That night, Kathy has another dream: as a child, she jumps out a window.

While moving into her new apartment the next day, Kathy is startled by the sudden appearance of a man named Danny. He mistook her for somebody named Maggie, for whom he's been searching. Kathy explains that she's never heard of any such person; embarrassed, Danny gives her a flower and leaves.

That evening, after a successful performance, Kevin and his band celebrate at Kathy's apartment. He stays afterward to help her clean up. They wash and dry the dishes, then make love in her bedroom. He suggests they share a place, either his or hers.

Late that night, Kathy has another bizarre dream; like the previous one, this dream features a long corridor ending in a large white door. On the other side of the door is a painting like the one which hangs above her father's bed.

When Kathy awakens from the dream, it is still dark outside. She enters her kitchen and, while fixing herself something to eat, notices that her apartment door is open. Kathy just has time to lock and chain the door before Danny emerges from the shadows. He attacks her murderously, and again demands to know where "Maggie" is. Despite his threats, Kathy denies knowing what he's talking about. She then tricks Danny and kills him with his own knife. Afterward, Kathy calls the police; they wonder if she and Danny were sexually involved, since there are traces of semen in her bed. She explains that it's Kevin's, not Danny's. The cops remain suspicious of Kathy's self-defense claims, as she admits to having fatally stabbed an unarmed man.

Kathy moves in with Kevin, despite Ben's objections. She keeps having nightmares about finding Danny in her bed, and about being attacked by him. Failing drug therapy, Kevin takes her to Dr. Michael James - who suggests visiting a local "Sleep Center". There Kathy's dreams are monitored with electrodes, so that she can be awakened just before Danny's appearance. Michael explains that her brain functions normally while Kathy sleeps...however, Kathy's body should be releasing a chemical to paralyze her during the dream; said chemical is absent, causing Kathy to partially act out her dreams.

Kathy continues performing with Kevin's jazz band. They receive an offer to record in London. That night, Kathy finds Danny in her bed where Kevin should be. It turns out to be just another nightmare. She returns to the Sleep Center. Michael suggests, in her dream, she subdue Danny without killing him. Their first attempt backfires; Kathy dreams of herself in Danny's position, assaulting and killing Kevin. She is persuaded to give it another try, and this time it works: instead of a Danny-like maniac, Kathy finds herself as a young girl dressed in Victorian garb. She has found peace in her "Dream World".

The next day, Kathy visits Martin - one of her father's friends. She returns to her apartment and finds Kevin with another woman. Kathy revisits the Sleep Center, where further experiments are being conducted based on her case. She offers to be Michael's test subject, but then dreams of him attacking and raping her in place of Danny. It turns out he forgot to give Kathy the drug which was part of the experiment.

Kathy patches things up with Kevin and they leave for London. She has nightmares about murdering him for his disloyalty.

Kevin and Kathy check into a London hotel. Kathy's dreams continue, making her wonder if she's awake or asleep. Meanwhile, fearing the worst, Ben and Michael arrive in London to hunt her up.

While visiting Ben at his hotel suite, Kathy has another nightmare about being a child. In the dream, she totes a teddy bear and wears a white dress - which suddenly turns deep red. Then her father enters, reveals himself as Danny, and rapes her.

Kathy, semi-awake and hallucinating, wounds Ben with a bread-knife and then rushes to the window...which offers a view similar to that in the picture above her father's bed. Still toting the knife, she follows a bird (a dead-ringer for the one featured in her dreams) onto the ledge and then jumps. The murderous "Dream Kathy" falls to her death, while the "Real Kathy" is caught by Michael and dragged back inside. Having at long last exorcised her own "Dark Side", Kathy smiles at both men.

== Cast ==
- Kristy McNichol as Kathy Gardner
- Ben Masters as Michael Hansen
- Paul Shenar as Ben Gardner
- Justin Deas as Kevin McCann
- John McMartin as Martin
- Gayle Hunnicutt as Claire
- Joseph Culp as Danny
- Matthew Penn as Billy
- Paul West as Shep
- Matthew Long as Vaughn Capisi
- Jon Polito as Dr. Michael James
- Ellen Parker as Nurse Jennifer

== Production and release ==
The film uses a clip of the 1952 film Ivanhoe, which was owned by Metro-Goldwyn Mayer (MGM), the producer of Dream Lover.

The film had its premiere at the Avoriaz Fantasy Film Festival in January 1986 and won the Grand Prix there, although there was vocal displeasure by the audience to the announcement. Audiences polled by CinemaScore gave the film an average grade of "D+" on an A+ to F scale.

Shortly after the film's release, Turner Broadcasting System acquired the rights to all films which MGM had released up until May 1986, with this library and the rest of Turner's assets being merged with Time Warner in October 1996. Turner released the film on VHS, and also on LaserDisc in Japan in 1990. Following Warner's acquisition of the film's rights, they released it on DVD as part of the Warner Archive Collection.
