= Two by Two (musical) =

1970 Broadway musical

Two By Two
- Original Cast Recording
- Music: Richard Rodgers
- Lyrics: Martin Charnin
- Book: Peter Stone
- Basis: Clifford Odets's play The Flowering Peach
- Productions: 1970 Broadway

Two By Two is a Broadway musical with a book by Peter Stone, lyrics by Martin Charnin, and music by Richard Rodgers.

Based on Clifford Odets' play The Flowering Peach, it tells the story of Noah's preparations for the Great Flood and its aftermath.

Directed by Joe Layton, the production opened on November 10, 1970 at the Imperial Theatre, where it ran for ten months. The opening night cast included Danny Kaye, Marilyn Cooper, Joan Copeland, Harry Goz, Madeline Kahn, Michael Karm, Tricia O'Neil, and Walter Willison.

== Production ==
Reviews were mixed, but positive for the score and cast. A couple months into the run Kaye became bored and began to improvise on a nightly basis. He ad-libbed shtick and comic asides to the audience. Improvising a dance one night, to impress Dick Cavett in the audience, he slipped and tore a tendon in his leg. Kaye continued with the show, appearing at each performance on crutches as young 90 year old Noah, and as Noah at 600 in a wheelchair.

"He appeared with his leg in a cast and either rode around the stage in a wheelchair — in which he sometimes would try to run down the other actors — or hobbled around the stage on a crutch — which he used to goose the girls," wrote Rodgers in his autobiography Musical Stages. "In addition, he began improvising his own lines and singing in the wrong tempos. He even made a curtain speech after the performances in which he said, 'I'm glad you're here, but I'm glad the authors aren't.' Apparently there was a certain curiosity value to all this, because people actually went to see Two by Two because of Danny's one-by-one vaudeville act. Others, of course, were appalled and expressed their irritation in letters to the [New York] Times."

The show is frequently performed by church and other amateur theatre groups, and there have been a few noteworthy revivals over the years. Milton Berle headed a production at the St. Louis Municipal Opera (The Muny) in 1971. Shelley Berman headed the show's National Touring company in 1972–73, co-starring Taina Elg as Esther. More recently, Tom Bosley sang Noah's role for a soundtrack slated for a (canceled) 2001 U.S. national tour of the show. Jason Alexander has been seen in the role in Los Angeles' "Reprise" production as well in New York's York Theatre "Musicals-in-Mufti" production directed by Martin Charnin. Walter Willison (the original Broadway "Japheth") has also appeared as Noah in the 2002 Richard Rodgers Centennial concert for the Jewish Repertory Theater Off-Broadway (which he also directed) and in regional productions of the show in recent years.

In 2004, Martin Charnin directed the World Premiere of the revised version of Two by Two at the Cumberland County Playhouse in Crossville, Tennessee. In creating the new version of Two by Two, Charnin stated that "I'm going to restore a concept that I had that was originally negated by Danny Kaye" The cast included Ruthie Ann Miles as Leah, Holly O'Brien as Goldie and Alan Baker as Noah.

In 2021, Walter Willison (the original Japheth) directed the show's semi-centennial, Two By Two: The 50th Anniversary Virtual Concert, which starred Willison as Noah, and Karen Ziemba as Esther. The show premiered on New Year's Day and benefited The Actors Fund. The show also starred Nikita Burshteyn as Japheth, Frank Calamaro as Shem, Marcy DeGonge Manfredi as Leah, N’Kenge as Goldie, Michael Notardonato as Ham, Sophia Tzougros as Rachel, and was hosted by Ted Chapin, president of Rodgers and Hammerstein.

== Awards ==
Kaye's lack of professionalism and Rodgers' public grousing about the liberties he took with the script allegedly ruined Kaye's chances for a Tony Award nomination. Willison was nominated for a Tony Award for Best Featured Actor in a Musical, and he and O'Neil received Theatre World Awards for their performances.

== Plot synopsis ==
On his 600th birthday, Noah receives a message from God, warning him about the impending flood. He is directed to save two of each animal and to build an ark for them. Noah's wife and family have their doubts and even make fun of him as he plans to build the ark, but join in when the animals start to appear en masse. "The story dealt with Noah and the flood, and though written in 1954, covered such contemporary themes as the generation gap and ecology," Rodgers wrote. "There was even a parallel between the flood and the atom bomb."

The gitka

The "gitka" is a magical Old Testament species of rodent, created by Clifford Odets, that sings in the presence of God. The arrival of one convinces the family of Noah's story. It has no mate so they are unable to bring her aboard.

== Songs ==
Act I

- Why Me?
- Put Him Away
- The Gitka's Song
- Something, Somewhere
- You Have Got to Have a Rudder on the Ark
- Something Doesn't Happen
- An Old Man
- Ninety Again!
- Two by Two
- I Do Not Know a Day I Did Not Love You
- Something, Somewhere (Reprise)

Act II

- When It Dries
- Two by Two (Reprise)
- You
- The Golden Ram
- Poppa Knows Best
- I Do Not Know a Day I Did Not Love You (Reprise)
- As Far as I'm Concerned
- Hey, Girlie
- The Covenant

The songs "Everything That's Gonna Be Has Been," "Getting Married to a Person," "The Brother Department," "The Death of Me" and "Forty Nights" were cut from the show prior to its Broadway opening; the latter song was cut because Danny Kaye decreed that no one in the show would have a funnier song than he. The song has been restored to many recent revivals.
