= 1976–77 United States network television schedule (late night) =

These are the late-night schedules for the three U.S. television networks during the 1976–77 season. All times are Eastern and Pacific.

PBS is not included, as member television stations had local flexibility with most of their schedules, and broadcast times for network shows might have varied. ABC and CBS are not included on the weekend schedules because those networks did not offer late-night programming on the weekend.

Talk/Variety shows are highlighted in yellow, Local News & Programs are highlighted in white.

== Monday-Friday ==
| - | 11:00 PM | 11:30 PM | 12:00 AM | 12:30 AM | 1:00 AM | 1:30 AM | 2:00 AM | 2:30 AM | 3:00 AM | 3:30 AM | 4:00 AM | 4:30 AM | 5:00 AM | 5:30 AM |
|---|---|---|---|---|---|---|---|---|---|---|---|---|---|---|
| ABC | Local | ABC Late Night | | | | | | | | | | Local programming or sign-off |
| CBS | local programming | The CBS Late Movie | | | | Local programming or sign-off |
| NBC | local programming | The Tonight Show Starring Johnny Carson | | | The Tomorrow Show (to 2:00; Mon.-Thur.)/The Midnight Special (Fri) | | | local programming or sign-off |

== Saturday ==
| - | | 11:00 PM | 11:30 PM | 12:00 AM | 12:30 AM | 1:00 AM | 1:30 AM | 2:00 AM | 2:30 AM | 3:00 AM | 3:30 AM | 4:00 AM | 4:30 AM | 5:00 AM | 5:30 AM |
|---|---|---|---|---|---|---|---|---|---|---|---|---|---|---|---|
| NBC | Fall | local programming | Weekend / NBC's Saturday Night | | | local programming or sign-off |
| NBC | Winter | local programming | Weekend / NBC's Saturday Night | | | local programming or sign-off |

== Sunday ==
| - | | 11:00 PM | 11:30 PM | 12:00 AM | 12:30 AM | 1:00 AM | 1:30 AM | 2:00 AM | 2:30 AM | 3:00 AM | 3:30 AM | 4:00 AM | 4:30 AM | 5:00 AM | 5:30 AM |
|---|---|---|---|---|---|---|---|---|---|---|---|---|---|---|---|
| NBC | Summer | local programming | NBC Late Night Movie | | | | local programming or sign-off |

== By network ==
=== ABC ===
Returning Series

- ABC Late Night

Not returning from 1975-76

- Good Night America!

=== CBS ===
Returning Series

- The CBS Late Movie

=== NBC ===
Returning Series

- The Midnight Special
- Saturday Night Live @
- The Tomorrow Show
- The Tonight Show Starring Johnny Carson
- Weekend

New Series

- NBC Late Night Movie

@ Formerly NBC's Saturday Night.
