= Ben Masters =

American actor (1947–2023)

- Born: Benjamin Masters; May 6, 1947; Corvallis, Oregon, U.S.
- Died: January 11, 2023 (aged 75); Palm Springs, California, U.S.
- Occupation: Actor
- Years active: 1974–2008

Benjamin Masters (May 6, 1947 – January 11, 2023) was an American actor who is best known for his portrayal of Julian Crane in daytime drama Passions from July 8, 1999, to the show's final episode on August 7, 2008.

== Early life ==
Masters was born in Corvallis, Oregon, and graduated from the University of Oregon as a theater major.

In 1975, while filming a TV movie, One of Our Own, he broke his neck in a car accident. The break was misdiagnosed and he was sent home but, after discussing the problem with one of the doctors consulting on the movie and at the urging of his costar, George Peppard, he went back to the hospital, where a hangman's break was confirmed. Surgeons placed him in a halo traction brace, leaving noticeable scars on his forehead.

== Career ==
Masters moved to New York City and landed a role in the off-Broadway play The Boys in the Band. He also had a 13-month run in Kevin Wade's Key Exchange off-Broadway. The Broadway plays Captain Brassbound's Conversion with Ingrid Bergman and The Cherry Orchard with Irene Worth, Raul Julia, and Meryl Streep followed. Masters portrayed Nick, the older brother of the titular character in the 1976–1977 Saturday morning series Muggsy.

Masters started in daytime dramas when he portrayed Vic Strang on Another World for three months in 1982.

Masters later appeared as corporate raider Linc Bartlett in the television miniseries Noble House in 1988.

On May 14, 1994, Masters was one of the guests in the Walker, Texas Ranger two-hour special episode titled "The Reunion".

In 1999, he signed a contract for NBC's Passions, as the womanizing billionaire Julian Crane. His role on the daytime drama landed him Soap Opera Digest Award nominations for Outstanding Supporting Actor in 2001 and 2002 and Outstanding Lead Actor in 2005. After NBC announced that it was cancelling Passions in February 2007, Masters said "I will miss getting to play this part so much. I had such a great time playing Julian Crane. I wanted to do it until I couldn't do it anymore." Passions was later picked up by Directv for the 2007–2008 season.

== Death ==
Masters died on January 11, 2023, at the age of 75, from complications of COVID-19 while battling dementia.

== Filmography ==
Film
Year	Title	Role	Notes
1975	Mandingo	Charles	
1979	All That Jazz	Dr. Garry	
1985	Key Exchange	Philip	
1986	Dream Lover	Michael Hansen	
1987	Making Mr. Right	Steve Marcus	
1994	Walker Texas Ranger 3: Deadly Reunion	Senator Julian Knox	

Television
Year	Title	Role	Notes
1976–1977	Muggsy	Nick Malloy	13 episodes
1980	The Shadow Box	Mark	TV movie
1984	Celebrity	Kleber Cantrell	Miniseries
1986	Kate's Secret	Jack Stark	TV movie
1986	The Deliberate Stranger	Det. Mike Fisher	TV movie
1988	Noble House	Linc Bartlett	4 episode
1988	Street of Dreams	Kyd Thomas	TV movie
1988–1989	HeartBeat	Dr. Leo Rosetti	18 episodes
1992	Cruel Doubt	Frank Johnston	2 episodes
1993	A Twist of the Knife	Prosecutor Dennis Chapin	TV movie
1995	Lady Killer	Ross Mitchell	
1997	The Second Civil War	Matthew Langford	TV movie
1997	Spy Game	General Sam Wellish	
1999–2008	Passions	Julian Crane	749 episodes
