= The Kids From C.A.P.E.R. =

- Main cast
- Genre: Saturday morning children's show, spy-fi
- Created by: Romeo Muller
- Developed by: Merrill Grant
- Directed by: Stanley Z. Cherry
- Starring: Steve Bonino, Cosie Costa, Biff Warren, John Lansing, Robert Emhardt, Robert Lussier
- Country of origin: United States
- Original language: English
- No. of seasons: 1
- No. of episodes: 13

Production
- Executive producers: Alan Landsburg, Don Kirshner
- Producer: Stanley Z. Cherry

Original release
- Network: NBC
- Release: September 11, 1976 – September 3, 1977

Related
- The Monkees

The Kids From C.A.P.E.R. is an American comedy television series that aired on NBC from September 11 to November 20, 1976, and reran from April 9 to September 3, 1977. All 13 episodes of the series were produced and directed by Stanley Z. Cherry; among the executive producers was Don Kirshner. Both Cherry and Kirshner had previously worked on The Monkees, Cherry having written the episode "Some Like It Lukewarm" in 1968, while Kirshner was the original musical supervisor for The Monkees until early 1967.

Although the show has not been released on video, there is an LP of most of the songs from the series, omitting "Baby Blue", "You're Under My Spell" and the show's theme. The LP was released by Kirshner Records and Tapes in 1977. One of the songs from the series, "When It Hit Me (The Hurricane Song)" was released as a single; the song was also recorded by Rob Hegel (who co-wrote the song) for his 1980 RCA album. Two other album tracks, "Tit for Tat" and "Baby Blue", had both been co-written and previously released by Neil Sedaka on his 1975 album Hungry Years.

== Overview ==
The "Kids from C.A.P.E.R." (the Civilian Authority for the Protection of Everybody, Regardless) are a team of four teenage boys headquartered in the 927th Police Precinct in the fictitious city of "Northeast Southweston"; together they help the police to solve unusual cases. The CAPERs communicate using "Caperband" Radios (walkie-talkies with a prominent "C" on them—actually modified Star Trek Communicators made by the Mego Corporation in 1974).

The group often travels around Northeast Southweston in the "Big Bologna", a one-time hot dog van converted into a mobile crime lab, while retaining the giant hot dog on the roof.

Each episode begins with a silent comedy vignette, with a cast member in voiceover giving the "Secret Word", which is usually key to that episode's plot. At the end of each episode, another silent vignette appears in which a "Caper Code" is given in voice over; a series of letters and numbers such as "P3 E8 R19 C2" (TIME), the code for the next episode's "secret word". Each episode features a song which is performed in a short and a long form at different points in the episode.

Episodes open with a narration by P.T., shortly followed by a visit from the week's girl guest star seeking their help.

One of many recurring gags is the explanation of what the acronym C.A.P.E.R. stood for: when asked, the team would quickly stand at attention and reply in unison, "The Civilian Authority for the Protection of Everybody, Regardless!" followed by a four-part harmonization of "Ta-da", reminiscent of The Three Stooges' harmonized "Hello".

=== Characters ===
- P.T. (played by Steve Bonino): "Cool and clever", per to the title song's lyrics, He often breaks the fourth wall to narrate, and has a variety of skills and talents including a superhuman sense of smell (he calls his nose "Seymour").
- Bugs (Cosie Costa): "Tough and feisty", he has superhuman strength and speed which he can summon only by looking at his hands. He is vulnerable to the word "bananas", which can inexplicably send him into a comical and debilitating fit.
- Doomsday (Biff Warren): "All full of sunshine", in contrast to his almost ninja-like black clothing, his talent is communicating with animals, and much of his conversation is about food.
- Doc (John Lansing): With "the looks, and the brains to catch the crooks", Doc is the scientist of the team, as well as the most expensively dressed.

==== Supporting characters ====
- Sergeant Vinton (Robert Emhardt), a policeman at the 927th who appears to have a consultative or advisory role.
- Kurt Klinsinger (Robert Lussier), a comically irresolute TV reporter who persistently pursues them in hopes of getting an exclusive.
- Mr. Featherstone, a shark puppet who lives in a fishtank in their headquarters and also has a tank inside the Big Bologna, with no indication of how he moved between them. He possesses a navigational sense when riding in the Big Bologna, but also speaks in unintelligible gibberish which a cast member usually translates for the benefit of the guest star and audience.

== Production ==
At the start of the 1976-77 television season, The Kids from C.A.P.E.R. was part of a three-hour block of six live action shows that aired Saturday Morning on NBC, alongside Land of the Lost, which was entering its third season, and four other new shows: Monster Squad; McDuff, the Talking Dog; Big John, Little John; and Muggsy. NBC shook up this lineup in late November, cancelling McDuff and putting The Kids from C.A.P.E.R. on hiatus. The Kids from C.A.P.E.R. returned on April 9, 1977, and replaced the cancelled Muggsy in the lineup. Neither C.A.P.E.R. nor any of the other three remaining shows returned to the NBC lineup for the beginning of the 1977-78 television season.

The pilot episode was refactored into a flashback episode in the full series: "Mummy's the Word", presumably to account for the changes in costume and set decoration. These changes are alluded to by lines of dialogue in the newer wrapper material episode, such as "Don't you remember the good old days, when the Big Bologna was blue?" and "Boy, you guys sure dressed funny in those days." The latter is said by Doomsday, the only character to retain his costume from the pilot.

The title sequence was reworked for the 1977 run to incorporate visuals from actual episodes; these were not present for the first run in 1976. The result is that the later titles are paced more in keeping with the theme music and contain more visual interest.

== Episodes ==
No.	Title	Original release date
1	"Too Much Time on Their Hands"	September 11, 1976
A girl scientist asks the CAPERs to stop a malfunctioning time machine before the bad guys catch up with them in the past.
2	"Kids from H.Y.D.E."	September 18, 1976
A mad professor enlists his daughter into giving the CAPERs a box of fudge which, unknown to them, is injected with a formula that turns them into tap dancing monsters who do very naughty things.
3	"Ghost from C.A.P.E.R."	September 25, 1976
A ghost haunting the police station turns out to be a magician called The Great Linguini, who enlists the CAPERs to help him find his lost love. But trouble arises when they return with three different women.
4	"The Uncanny Nanny"	October 2, 1976
A girl asks the CAPERs to help her with an obnoxious boy who disappears after being handed over to the beloved Nanny Noony, who may herself be on the verge of a nervous breakdown.
5	"Invasion of the Frankfurter Snatchers"	October 9, 1976
Dr. Franklin Stein and his daughter try to convince everyone that the town is being invaded by giant frankfurter aliens who hide in hot dogs and take over people’s minds. Their warnings are ignored until everyone (except P.T.) has been turned into hot dog zombies.
6	"The Pieman's Pool"	October 16, 1976
The daughter of a famous pastry chef asks the CAPERs to investigate her father's latest delicacies; they explode, causing earthquakes!
7	"King Cone"	October 23, 1976
While the CAPERs investigate a rash of ice cream thefts, they are asked to find a circus acrobat who was supposed to arrive at the same time as the circus' new gorilla King Cone (who just happens to love ice cream). Could the two cases possibly be related?
8	"The Post Monster General"	October 30, 1976
When Bugs accidentally uses a collection of rare stamps to mail out invitations to the policeman’s ball, the CAPERs must recover them before the Post Monster General gets a hold of them.
9	"The Terrible Tollman"	November 6, 1976
The Terrible Tollman hypnotizes nearly everyone into thinking the Roger P. Folkelman, Jr. Memorial Bridge is gone, and Doomsday (one of the few not hypnotized) is the only one who can stop the Tollman.
10	"Dunga Gin"	November 13, 1976
The city's water supply is stolen just as two con men start selling GLOB Cola. The CAPERs suspect a connection between the two incidents, but get in peril while trying to find water.
11	"Phantom of the Drive-In"	November 20, 1976
When a phantom begins scaring patrons away from Durkin Farbe’s Starlight Emporium Drive-In, the CAPERs are called to go undercover as drive-in employees, but they themselves end up getting captured by the Phantom.
12	"Mummy's the Word"	May 21, 1977
The CAPERs reminisce about a past case, when they helped Selma Lee save her Egyptian mummy from two ruthless thieves out to steal the sarcophagus and its priceless jewels.
13	"The Goodfather"	August 13, 1977
Everyone is confused when the city is hit by an "un-crime" wave; someone is feeding parking meters and committing a rash of "hold-downs" (rather than holdups) forcing money and jewels on unsuspecting victims.
