= McDuff, the Talking Dog =

- Starring: Walter Willison
- Country of origin: United States
- No. of episodes: 13 (2 unaired)

Production
- Running time: 22? minutes
- Production companies: Wilder-Raynor Productions; D'Angelo-Bullock-Allen Productions

Original release
- Network: NBC
- Release: September 11 – November 20, 1976

McDuff, The Talking Dog is a Saturday morning live action television program that aired on NBC in 1976. The show centered on the ghost of a 100-year-old sheepdog who used to live in the home now owned by a veterinarian, Dr. Calvin Campbell (played by Walter Willison). McDuff (voice provided by Jack Lester; né Jack Lester Swineford; 1915–2004) could talk not only to the other animals, but also to Dr. Campbell. However, Dr. Campbell was the only person who could hear or see McDuff, which often led to wacky situations.

Dr. Campbell's neighbor, Amos Ferguson, was played by Gordon Jump.

== Broadcast history ==
At the beginning of the 1976-77 television season, McDuff, the Talking Dog was part of a three-hour block of six live action shows aired on Saturday mornings on NBC, alongside Land of the Lost, which was entering its third season, and four other new shows: Monster Squad; Big John, Little John; The Kids from C.A.P.E.R.; and Muggsy. None of the six shows returned for the beginning of 1977–78 season, with McDuff being the first casualty. It was cancelled after only two months—after airing only 11 of the 13 episodes that had been produced. The original films were lost in a fire making a release of this material impossible, the only known evidence that survives is a promo for the show during the credits of The Pink Panther Laugh-and-a-Half, Hour and a Half Show.

== Cast ==
The cast included:

- Walter Willison: Dr. Calvin Campbell
- Jack Lester (né Jack Lester Swineford; 1915–2004): McDuff (voice)
- Michelle Stacy: Kimmy Campbell
- Gordon Jump: Amos Ferguson
- Johnnie Collins III: Squeaky
- Monty Margetts: Mrs. Osgood
