= Way Out Games =

American game show

- Genre: Game show
- Directed by: Richard S. Kline
- Presented by: Sonny Fox; Mark Maxwell-Smith
- Country of origin: United States
- Original language: English

Production
- Production locations: Magic Mountain, Valencia, California
- Production companies: Barry & Enright Productions; MGM Television

Original release
- Network: CBS
- Release: 11 September 1976 – 2 April 1977

Way Out Games is a 1976-1977 weekly athletic competition game show where a total of 51 teams representing the United States and Puerto Rico competed in a series of athletic events, with emphasis based on humor and the unexpected.

Way Out Games aired on CBS from September 11, 1976 to April 2, 1977, (with reruns continuing through September 3, 1977) and was hosted by Sonny Fox. The show was produced by Barry & Enright Productions in association with MGM Television, and originated at Magic Mountain in Valencia, California.

== Gameplay ==
Every week, three different teams would compete in various athletic events and would earn points for winning an event. The team that won the first event scored one point, the second event awarded two points, and the final event awarded three points. The team with the most points after the third event would come back on a later show to compete against other winning teams. Prizes and trophies would also be given to the winners.

There would be 17 weeks of regular competition, 6 weeks of Quarterfinals (with one Quarterfinal having only two teams), 2 weeks of Semi-Finals, and a Championship Final, with one match each week.

In the Championship finals, shown in April 1977, Oregon defeated Indiana.

== Broadcast history ==
Way Out Games aired Saturdays at 12:30 P.M. Eastern from September 1976 to January 1977. It then moved a half-hour later to 1:00 P.M. Eastern from February to April 1977. Reruns were then aired at 7:00 A.M. Sundays from April to September 1977.

Some CBS affiliates even dropped Way Out Games midway through its run in favor of syndicated series (like Soul Train) and sports, such being commonplace among Saturday morning series after 12 Noon and on Sunday mornings.
