= Muggsy (TV series) =

- Genre: Drama
- Starring: Sarah MacDonnell; Ben Masters; Paul Michael; Star-Shemah Bobatoon
- Country of origin: United States
- Original language: English
- No. of seasons: 1
- No. of episodes: 12 (plus 1 unaired)

Production
- Producers: Elizabeth Callan; Joseph F. Callo
- Editor: Jerome Haggart
- Running time: 30 min
- Production company: NBC

Original release
- Network: NBC
- Release: September 11, 1976 – January 29, 1977

Muggsy is a Saturday morning live action television program that aired on NBC in 1976–1977.

== Synopsis ==
Filmed on location in Bridgeport, Connecticut, the show centered on Margaret “Muggsy” Malloy (Sarah MacDonnell), who lived with her older brother Nick (Ben Masters), a cab driver, in a furnished truck converted into an apartment, behind a gas station. The show followed Muggsy's life in the inner city and the problems she faced growing up, including drugs and gangs. Muggsy was one of few Saturday morning shows that dealt with the contemporary issues of the time.

David Clayton-Thomas of Blood, Sweat & Tears sang the theme song.

== Broadcast history ==
At the start of the 1976-77 television season, Muggsy was part of a three-hour block of six live action shows that aired Saturday mornings on NBC, alongside Land of the Lost, which was entering its third season, and four other new shows: Monster Squad, McDuff, the Talking Dog, Big John, Little John and The Kids from C.A.P.E.R. Muggsy was cancelled in April 1977; The Kids from C.A.P.E.R. replaced it after being put on hiatus during a shakeup of the lineup in November, 1976, in which McDuff, the Talking Dog was cancelled. None of the other shows returned for the start of the 1977-78 television season. Though 13 episodes were made, only 12 of them aired.

== Cast ==
- Sarah MacDonnell as Margaret "Muggsy" Malloy
- Ben Masters as Nick Malloy
- Paul Michael as Gus
- Star-Shemah as Clytemnestra
- Jimmy McCann as Lil' Man

== Episodes ==
No.	Title	Original release date
1	"Rage to Burn"	September 11, 1976
2	"A Question of Loyalty"	September 18, 1976
3	"The Race Problem"	September 25, 1976
4	"T.P. and the Satans"	October 2, 1976
5	"Hit and Run"	October 9, 1976
6	"The Biggest Liar in Town"	October 30, 1976
7	"The Dognappers"	November 6, 1976
8	"Li'l Man in Big Trouble"	November 13, 1976
9	"The Getaway"	November 20, 1976
10	"Strangers on the Run"	November 27, 1976
11	"The Big Break"	December 11, 1976
12	"Special Delivery"	January 29, 1977
13	"Episode 13"	N/A
