= KOTA (AM) =

- Rapid City, South Dakota; United States
- Broadcast area: Black Hills
- Frequency: 1380 kHz
- Branding: News Radio KOTA

Programming
- Format: News/talk
- Affiliations: Fox News Radio; Compass Media Networks; Radio America; Premiere Networks; Westwood One; South Dakota Mines Hardrockers; Denver Broncos Radio Network

Ownership
- Owner: Riverfront Broadcasting, LLC
- Sister stations: KQRQ, KZZI, KDDX, KZLK, KDSJ

History
- First air date: January 19, 1937 (as KOBH)
- Former call signs: KOBH (1936–1945)
- Call sign meaning: Dakota

Technical information
- Licensing authority: FCC
- Facility ID: 17678
- Class: B
- Power: 5,000 watts
- Transmitter coordinates: 44°1′59.96″N 103°11′16.65″W
- Translator: 100.7 K264CP (Rapid City)

Links
- Public license information: Public file; LMS
- Webcast: Listen Live
- Website: kotaradio.com

KOTA (1380 kHz, "NewsRadio 1380 KOTA") is an AM radio station licensed to serve Rapid City, South Dakota. The station is owned by Riverfront Broadcasting, LLC. It airs a news/talk radio format.

The station was assigned these call letters by the Federal Communications Commission.

Weekday programming includes the Rapid City Morning News and Straight Up With Matt Smith, as well as nationally syndicated programming including The Clay Travis and Buck Sexton Show, Sean Hannity, and Dave Ramsey.

Weekend programming includes syndicated programming from Kim Komando and a variety of lifestyle programming. During the NFL football season, select Sunday games are aired from Westwood One Radio Networks as well as every Monday and Thursday night game. The station also airs all Denver Broncos game through the Denver Broncos Radio Network. All playoff and Super Bowl games are carried as well.

KOTA is the radio home of South Dakota Mines Hardrockers football and basketball, and features the yearly Homestake Trophy game.

== History ==
The station first hit the airwaves on November 26, 1936, as KOBH ("Kall of the Black Hills"), a Thanksgiving Day present to western South Dakota. It was owned by Black Hills Broadcasting, and operated from studios in the Hotel Alex Johnson in downtown Rapid City.

Originally broadcasting with a very limited licensed power of 150 watts, in 1944 KOBH sought approval from the Federal Communications Commission to move up to 5000 watts, which would dramatically improve its ability to reach this mountainous area. Asked to help, Congressman Francis H. Case sought military support. He discovered that U.S. Army Air Corps airplanes based at the recently established Rapid City Army Air Base (later renamed Ellsworth Air Force Base) used KOBH as a navigation beacon while training for European strategic bombing during World War II. With Pentagon backing, Case convinced the FCC to grant the power increase. On New Year's Day 1945, the station signed on from its new, more powerful tower under new call letters, KOTA. In the same year, it secured an affiliation with CBS Radio that continues to this day.

In 1954, Rapid City businesswoman Helen Duhamel, a minority owner since 1943, bought full control of the station, changing its corporate name to Duhamel Broadcasting Enterprises. Since the 1990s, it has been a news and talk station.

In May 2017, the station signed on a new FM signal in Rapid City. The FM translator has an assigned frequency of 100.7 FM and an effective radiated power of 250-watts. The licensed translator uses the FCC assigned call sign K264CP. This was done as part of the FCC’s AM Revitalization program.

Notable alumni of the station include B-movie producer Arch Hall Sr.

On January 1, 2019, the Duhamel family sold KOTA to Riverfront Broadcasting for $3.6 million. The sale was completed on May 1.

The station's name is closely associated with its television counterpart, KOTA-TV, and the shared news operation is frequently referred to locally as KOTA Territory News

KOTA-TV (channel 3) went on the air in 1955 as the first television station in western South Dakota. It was explicitly owned by Duhamel, who also owned KOTA radio, creating a unified broadcasting entity under Duhamel Broadcasting Enterprises.

The two stations remained under common ownership by the Duhamel family for nearly 60 years until the television properties were sold to Schurz Communications in 2014. This sale separated KOTA-TV from the long-time sister radio stations (which the Duhamels retained until 2019).

== Translator ==
Broadcast translator for KOTA
Call sign	Frequency	City of license	FID	ERP (W)	HAAT	Class	Transmitter coordinates	FCC info
K264CP	100.7 FM	Rapid City, South Dakota	143016	250	94 m (308 ft)	D	44°4′7″N 103°15′3.7″W	LMS
