= Jake Peetz =

American football player and coach (born 1985)

Seattle Seahawks
- Title: Pass game coordinator/Quarterbacks

Personal information
- Born: April 5, 1985 (age 41); O'Neill, Nebraska, U.S.
- Listed height: 5 ft 10 in (1.78 m)
- Listed weight: 185 lb (84 kg)

Career information
- Position: Defensive back
- High school: St. Mary's (O'Neill, Nebraska)
- College: Nebraska (2003–2005)

Career history

Coaching
- Santa Barbara City College (2006) Special teams coordinator, safeties coach & strength & conditioning coordinator; UCLA (2007) Defensive assistant; Jacksonville Jaguars (2012) Assistant quarterbacks coach; Alabama (2013) Offensive analyst; Washington Redskins (2014) Offensive quality control coach; Oakland Raiders (2015-2017); Senior offensive assistant (2015); Assistant quarterbacks coach (2016); Quarterbacks coach (2017); Alabama (2018) Offensive analyst; Carolina Panthers (2019-2020); Running backs coach (2019); Quarterbacks coach (2020); LSU (2021) Offensive coordinator & quarterbacks coach; Los Angeles Rams (2022-2023); Offensive assistant (2022); Pass game specialist (2023); Seattle Seahawks (2024–present); Pass game coordinator/quarterbacks (2024-2025); Pass game coordinator (2026-present)

Operations
- Jacksonville Jaguars (2008–2011) Scout

Awards and highlights
- Super Bowl champion (LX)

Jake Peetz (born April 5, 1985) is an American professional football coach who is the Pass Game Coordinator and Quarterbacks Coach for the Seattle Seahawks of the National Football League (NFL). He previously served as an assistant coach for the Los Angeles Rams, Carolina Panthers, Oakland Raiders, Washington Redskins and Jacksonville Jaguars. Peetz also coached collegiately at Alabama and at LSU where he was offensive coordinator. He has worked for three head coaches twice in his career: Nick Saban (Alabama), Sean McVay (Redskins & Rams), and Jack Del Rio (Jaguars & Raiders).

== Early life ==
A native of O'Neill, Nebraska, Peetz attended St. Mary's High School, where he played tight end, cornerback, defensive end and long snapper. Peetz then attended the University of Nebraska–Lincoln, where he played defensive back and long snapper at Nebraska from 2003 to 2005. While at Nebraska, Peetz was twice named to the Brook Berringer Citizenship Team for his extensive community outreach work. Peetz graduated from Nebraska in exercise science in December of 2005.

== Coaching career ==
=== Early career ===
Peetz spent time with coaching on both sides of the ball at UCLA, then moved to the Jacksonville Jaguars, working in both the scouting and coaching sides. He then went to his first tour at the University of Alabama working with the Quarterbacks, then moved to the Washington Redskins, where he first worked with his former employer Sean McVay. Peetz would rejoin his former head coach in Jacksonville, Jack Del Rio, with the Oakland Raiders in 2015.

=== Oakland Raiders ===
In three seasons with the Raiders, Peetz served as Senior Offensive Assistant and as the Quarterbacks coach of the Oakland Raiders. Under his coaching, Derek Carr was named to the Pro Bowl thrice.

=== Carolina Panthers ===
After spending a year on his second tour at the University of Alabama, Peetz was named the running backs coach of the Carolina Panthers in 2019 after former coach Jim Skipper retired. Under his coaching, Christian McCaffrey led the NFL in touches, total touchdowns and all-purpose yards. He also led all running backs in points scored and receptions, and was named 1st-team All-Pro and selected to the Pro Bowl. In 2020, Peetz was named the team's quarterbacks coach under new head coach Matt Rhule.

=== LSU ===
On January 6, 2021, Peetz was hired to be the offensive coordinator at Louisiana State University (LSU) under head coach Ed Orgeron. In 2021, Quarterback Max Johnson threw for 27 touchdowns, which ranks for fourth in LSU history and Running Back Ty Davis-Price set the single game LSU rushing record in a victory vs the University of Florida.

=== Los Angeles Rams ===
On February 21, 2022, Peetz was hired by the Los Angeles Rams to serve under head coach Sean McVay. On December 10, it was announced that Peetz had turned down an offer to join the Nebraska Cornhuskers' coaching staff as their Offensive Coordinator, instead electing to remain with the Rams.

After the 2022 season, he was promoted to the pass game specialist position.

=== Seattle Seahawks ===
On February 15, 2024, Peetz was hired by the Seattle Seahawks as their pass game coordinator under new head coach Mike Macdonald. He was part of the coaching staff that won Super Bowl LX over the New England Patriots 29–13.

== Personal life ==
Peetz and his wife, Maggie, have nine children.
