= Helen Duhamel =

American broadcaster

Helen S. Duhamel
- Born: November 26, 1904; Windsor, Missouri, US
- Died: November 8, 1991 (aged 86); Rapid City, South Dakota, US
- Education: St. Mary's Catholic School, St. Agnes Academy
- Occupations: Businesswoman, broadcaster
- Spouse: Francis A. "Bud" Duhamel (1902–2000)

Helen S. Duhamel (November 26, 1904 – November 8, 1991) was an American businesswoman and broadcaster. She was best known for saving the Duhamel Company from bankruptcy and establishing a cluster of radio and television stations in western South Dakota and Nebraska in the United States.

== Early life and education ==
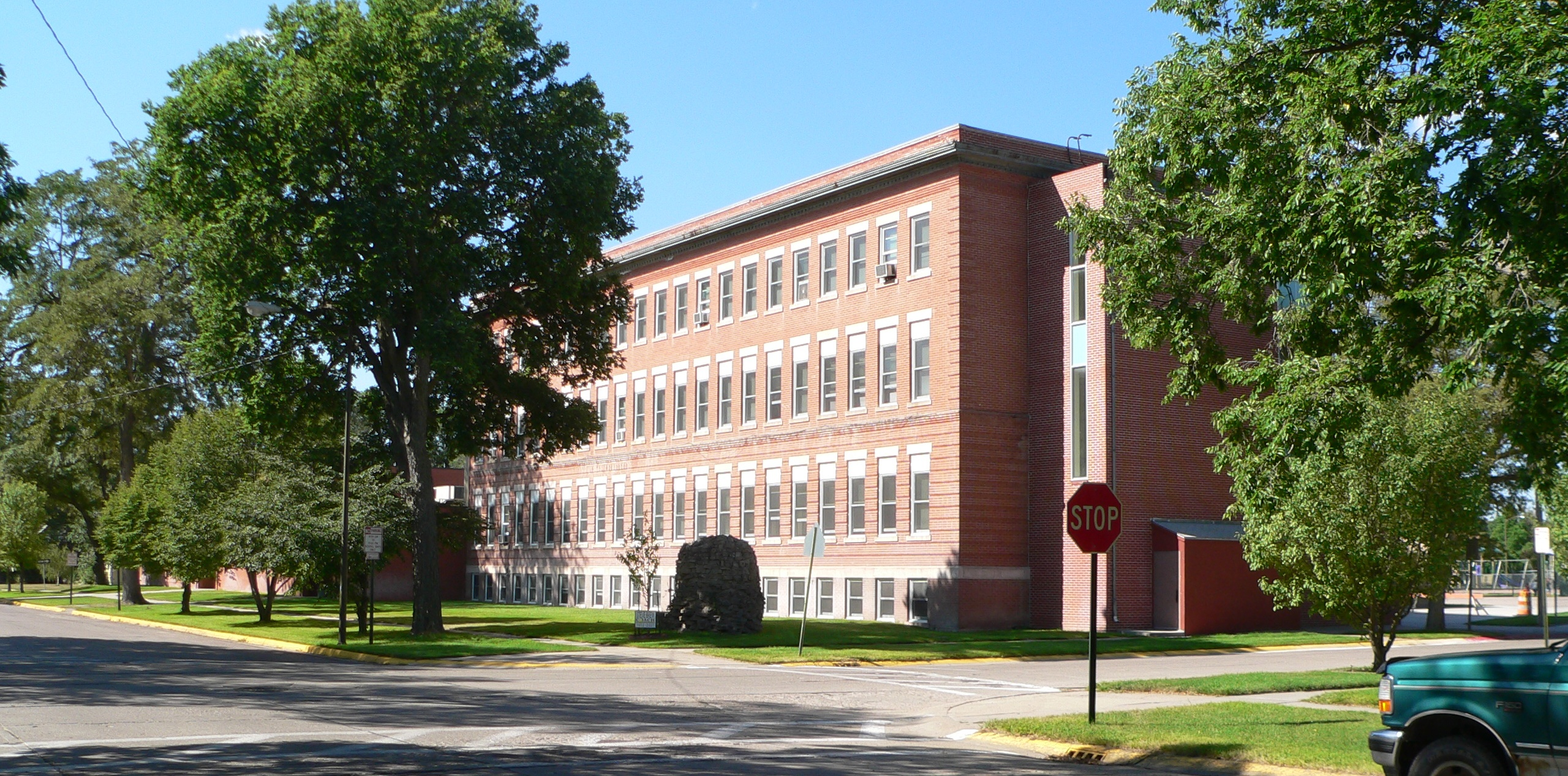
Helen Duhamel completed her formal education at St. Agnes Academy in Alliance, Nebraska.

Helen Duhamel was born on November 26, 1904, in Windsor, Missouri, and she moved to northwestern Nebraska when she was two years old. She grew up on a cattle ranch on the White River north of Chadron. Her schooling began at St. Mary's Catholic School in O'Neill, Nebraska, and was completed at St. Agnes Academy, Alliance, Nebraska. She graduated from Rapid City High School in 1922.

== Career ==
=== The Duhamel Company ===
Marrying Bud introduced her to the Duhamel family business, which had started as a hardware store in Rapid City in the early twentieth century. Selling everything except groceries and threshing machines, the Duhamel Trading Post specialized in saddle making, becoming the largest U.S. supplier of saddles by World War I.

During the Great Depression, Mrs. Duhamel became the company's bookkeeper, and her business acumen is credited with keeping the company out of bankruptcy.

=== Radio ===
In 1943, aware of the use she had made of radio advertising for the family business, Duhamel took an interest in radio station KOBH (1380 AM) and began buying its stock. At the time, KOBH was the only radio station in western South Dakota, and it was located directly across the street from the Duhamel Trading Post in Rapid City. Its studios were on the 10th floor of the Hotel Alex Johnson, while the station's offices were on the 11th.

Originally broadcasting with a very limited licensed power of 150 watts, in 1944 KOBH sought approval from the Federal Communications Commission to move up to 5000 watts, which would dramatically expand the territory it could reach. Asked to help, U.S. Congressman Francis H. Case sought military support. He discovered that U.S. Army Air Corps airplanes based at the recently established Rapid City Army Air Base (later renamed Ellsworth Air Force Base) used KOBH as a navigation beacon while training for European strategic bombing during World War II. With Pentagon backing, Case convinced the FCC to grant the more powerful license effective January 1, 1945. The call letters changed to KOTA, the last two syllables of "Dakota".

In 1953–1954, an out-of-state investor was maneuvering to buy KOTA. To counter this, Duhamel bought all outstanding stock and established Duhamel Broadcasting Enterprises as the corporate entity.

=== Television ===
In 1955, Duhamel oversaw the creation of KOTA-TV, only the second television station in South Dakota at the time. In order to supply programming, she erected a chain of microwave transmitters to bring live TV signals to Rapid City for broadcast over KOTA-TV. Upon completion it was then "the world's longest privately owned microwave system."

In 1966, Duhamel became a partner in South Dakota Cable, and began installing cable television in western South Dakota.

Approached by rural residents of the western Nebraska Panhandle about expanding television coverage there, she decided to expand to the south. Although she originally established it in Hay Springs, Nebraska, she moved KDUH-TV to Scottsbluff, Nebraska, in 1981.

With this and other expansions, Duhamel Broadcasting Enterprises came to operate the original AM radio station, an FM radio station, and four television stations, with a transmission area that extended into eastern Wyoming and Montana.

== Reception ==
In 1961, Helen Duhamel was elected president of the South Dakota Broadcasters Association. She was not only the first woman to hold that position, but the first woman in the United States to hold the comparable top post in any state broadcasting association.

Helen Duhamel received numerous awards, including the Alfred P. Sloan Radio-Television Award for Distinguished Public Service, the McCall's Golden Mike Award (1957), and a letter of commendation from the President of the United States for the public service work of the Duhamel stations during the June 1972 Black Hills flood. She was selected for the South Dakota Broadcasters' Association Hall of Fame in 1976 and the Nebraska Broadcasters' Association Hall of Fame in 1992. In 2002, she was inducted into the Association for Women in Communications Hall of Fame.

== Personal life ==
In 1920, at age 15, Helen moved with her mother to Rapid City, South Dakota. There she met Francis A. "Bud" Duhamel (1902–2000), marrying him in 1924 at age 19.

In the same year that she and Bud celebrated their 67th wedding anniversary, Helen Duhamel died in Rapid City on November 8, 1991.

Her son, Bill Duhamel, succeeded her as president and general manager of Duhamel Broadcasting Enterprises. After Schurz Communications acquired KOTA-TV in 2014, the Duhamel radio stations were sold on January 1, 2019.

== See also ==
- KOTA (AM)
- KHME
