= Nebraska Northeastern Railway =

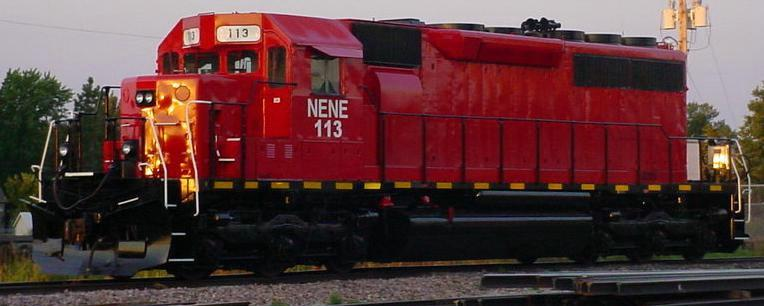
- Nebraska Northeastern Locomotive

Overview
- Headquarters: Osmond, Nebraska
- Reporting mark: NENE
- Locale: Nebraska
- Dates of operation: 1996–2012

Technical
- Track gauge: 4 ft 8 1/2 in (1,435 mm) standard gauge
- Length: 120 miles (190 km)

The Nebraska Northeastern Railway (reporting mark NENE) was a shortline railroad that began operations on July 23, 1996, in northeastern Nebraska. It operated on about 120 miles of former Burlington Northern Railroad track between Ferry Station, NE and O'Neill, Nebraska, as well as trackage rights over the BNSF Railway, Burlington Northern's successor, into Sioux City, Iowa.

In October 2012, The Federal Surface Transportation Board approved the BNSF Railway buying back the Nebraska Northeastern for an undisclosed sum. The Nebraska Northeastern line would serve to optimize grain traffic through the region for the BNSF, and also serves three major ethanol production facilities: Siouxland Ethanol LLC in Jackson, Neb.; NEDAK Ethanol in Atkinson, Neb.; and Husker Ag Inc. in Plainview, Neb.
