= Battle of 33rd Street =

American college basketball rivalry

- Drexel Dragons Penn Quakers
- Sport: Basketball
- Location: Philadelphia
- First meeting: December 14, 1920; Penn 28, Drexel 10
- Latest meeting: December 7, 2024; Drexel 60, Penn 47
- Next meeting: November 21, 2025
- Stadiums: Daskalakis Athletic Center; Palestra

Statistics
- Total meetings: 28
- All-time series: Penn leads 17–11
- Regular season series: Penn leads 17–11
- Postseason results: None
- Largest victory: Penn, 48–16 (1922)
- Smallest victory: 1 (1988, 2015)
- Longest win streak: Penn, 7 (1920–1928)
- Current win streak: Drexel, 1 (2024–Present)

Locations of Drexel and Penn

The Battle of 33rd Street rivalry refers to the men's college basketball rivalry between Drexel University and University of Pennsylvania ('Penn') in Philadelphia, Pennsylvania. The rivalry is fueled by the proximity of the schools to each other, as the rivalry is known for being the closest geographical rivalry in NCAA Division I college sports. The campuses of the two schools share a physical border, and the teams' home courts are mere blocks away from each other, as Drexel's Daskalakis Athletic Center is located at 34th and Market Street, and Penn's historic Palestra is located on 33rd Street south of Walnut Street. The series was originally played at the Palestra every year until 2015 with the exception of the 2008 game, when Penn played at Drexel for the first time in team history. Beginning in 2015, the location began alternating between the two schools.

Beginning with the 2023–24 season, Drexel officially became part of the Philadelphia Big 5, which historically included the Philadelphia area's five other Division I programs—Penn, La Salle, Saint Joseph's, Temple, and Villanova. The current Big 5 format sees the six teams divided into three-team pods, with Drexel and Penn being placed in separate pods. While they will likely continue to play annually, they will not do so within the Big 5 unless both teams finish in the same position in their respective pods.

The teams began playing against each other annually during the 1996–97 NCAA basketball season. Previous to this season, the teams faced each other only eight times. Seven of those games were during the 1920s, where Penn won all seven, and the eighth game was in 1988, where Drexel won 70–69.

== Results ==
Drexel victories	Penn victories

No.	Date	Location	Winner	Score
1	December 14, 1920	Weightman Hall	Penn	28–10
2	December 7, 1921	Weightman Hall	Penn	24–10
3	December 13, 1922	Weightman Hall	Penn	48–16
4	December 8, 1923	Weightman Hall	Penn	28–13
5	December 6, 1924	Weightman Hall	Penn	34–11
6	December 11, 1926	Weightman Hall	Penn	39–26
7	December 19, 1928	Palestra	Penn	35–14
8	December 10, 1988	Palestra	Drexel	70–69
9	January 15, 1997	Palestra	Drexel	58–52
10	January 20, 1998	Palestra	Penn	79–65
11	January 21, 1999	Palestra	Penn	75–65
12	January 25, 2000	Palestra	Penn	54–46
13	January 10, 2001	Palestra	Drexel	68–63
14	November 28, 2001	Palestra	Penn	89–80
15	November 25, 2002	Palestra	Drexel	71–62

No.	Date	Location	Winner	Score
16	November 24, 2003	Palestra	Penn	79–73
17	November 23, 2004	Palestra	Penn	81–50
18	November 26, 2005	Palestra	Penn	68–60
19	November 21, 2006	Palestra	Penn	68–49
20	November 9, 2007	Palestra	Drexel	67–59^{OT}
21	November 18, 2008	Daskalakis Athletic Center	Drexel	66–64
22	November 24, 2009	Palestra	Drexel	58–49
23	November 20, 2010	Palestra	Drexel	77–56
24	November 17, 2012	Palestra	Drexel	61–59
25	December 22, 2015	Daskalakis Athletic Center	Drexel	53–52^{OT}
26	December 28, 2016	Palestra	Penn	75–67
27	November 15, 2022	Daskalakis Athletic Center	Penn	64–59
28	December 7, 2024	Wells Fargo Center	Drexel	60–47
29	November 21, 2025	Daskalakis Athletic Center		
Series: Penn leads 17–11

- The game on December 19, 1928 was scheduled to be the first game played at Drexel, in the newly constructed Curtis Hall, however construction was not completed in time and the game was moved to Palestra.
- In 2008, at the first game in the series to be played at the Daskalakis Athletic Center, the game was featured on ESPN Hoops Marathon and tipped off at 10 a.m.
- In, 2023 Drexel was admitted to the Philadelphia Big 5 which Penn had already been a member. In 2024, Drexel and Penn faced each other for the first time as Big 5 members in the Big 5 fifth place game at Wells Fargo Center, which was the first neutral site game in the rivalry.

== Hiatus in 2011, 2013–2014, 2017–2021 ==
In the 2011–12 season, Drexel and Penn did not play against each other, ending a 14-year streak due to a dispute over where the game should be played. In 1997, the teams agreed to play their games at the Palestra, as it is where many Philadelphia Big 5 and City 6 games are generally played at. However, since then, Drexel's basketball team had greatly improved, and Drexel favored changing the series structure so that the location would alternate between the schools each season. The teams resumed play in the 2012–13 season at The Palestra, but did not play again until the 2015–16 season, when Penn agreed to resume the series at Drexel. From that point forward, the location of the game would supposedly alternate between The Palestra and Daskalakis Athletic Center each season, although after Drexel returned to the Palestra in the 2016–17 season, the teams did not continue the series until 2022.

== Other events ==
The schools also occasionally face each other in other sports, including lacrosse, women's basketball, and field hockey.

On March 11, 2014, Drexel and Penn faced each other in the first round of the 2014 NCAA Division I Men's Lacrosse Championship. The teams earned automatic bids by winning each of their conference tournaments, and marked Drexel's first invitation to the national championship. The game was played at Franklin Field, and the Dragons defeated the Quakers by score of 16–11 to advance to the tournament quarterfinals.

== See also ==
- Battle of the Ravine, a college football rivalry between two NCAA Division II programs with adjacent campuses
