= KZZI =

- Belle Fourche, South Dakota; United States
- Broadcast area: Rapid City, South Dakota
- Frequency: 95.9 MHz
- Branding: The Eagle

Programming
- Format: Country
- Affiliations: United Stations Radio Networks; Westwood One

Ownership
- Owner: Riverfront Broadcasting, LLC
- Sister stations: KDDX, KOTA, KQRQ, KZLK

History
- First air date: September 22, 1995
- Former call signs: KBFS-FM (1994, CP); KDFX (1994–1995, CP)

Technical information
- Licensing authority: FCC
- Facility ID: 38630
- Class: C
- ERP: 100,000 watts
- HAAT: 545 meters (1788 feet)
- Transmitter coordinates: 44°19′35″N 103°50′06″W
- Translator: see below

Links
- Public license information: Public file; LMS
- Webcast: Listen Live
- Website: myeaglecountry.com

KZZI (95.9 FM, "The Eagle") is a radio station licensed to serve Belle Fourche, South Dakota, serving the Rapid City, South Dakota market. The station is owned by Riverfront Broadcasting, LLC. It airs a country music format.

The station was assigned the KZZI call letters by the Federal Communications Commission on April 1, 1995.

KZZI is the radio home of Black Hills State Yellow Jackets athletics, with local radio personality Steve Ammerman providing play-by-play.

== Ownership ==
In February 1999, Western South Dakota Broadcasting LLC reached an agreement to purchase this station from Lovcom, for a reported $79,006. The station was then sold to Riverfront Broadcasting in 2019.

== Honors and awards ==
In May 2006, KZZI won one first place plaque in the commercial radio division of the South Dakota Associated Press Broadcasters Association news contest. The contest was for the 2005 calendar year.

== Translator ==
Broadcast translator for KZZI
| Call sign | Frequency | City of license | FID | ERP (W) | HAAT | Class | FCC info |
|---|---|---|---|---|---|---|---|
| K242BK | 96.3 FM | Rapid City, South Dakota | 158530 | 250 | 119.6 m (392 ft) | D | LMS |
