= O'Neill, Nebraska =

- City
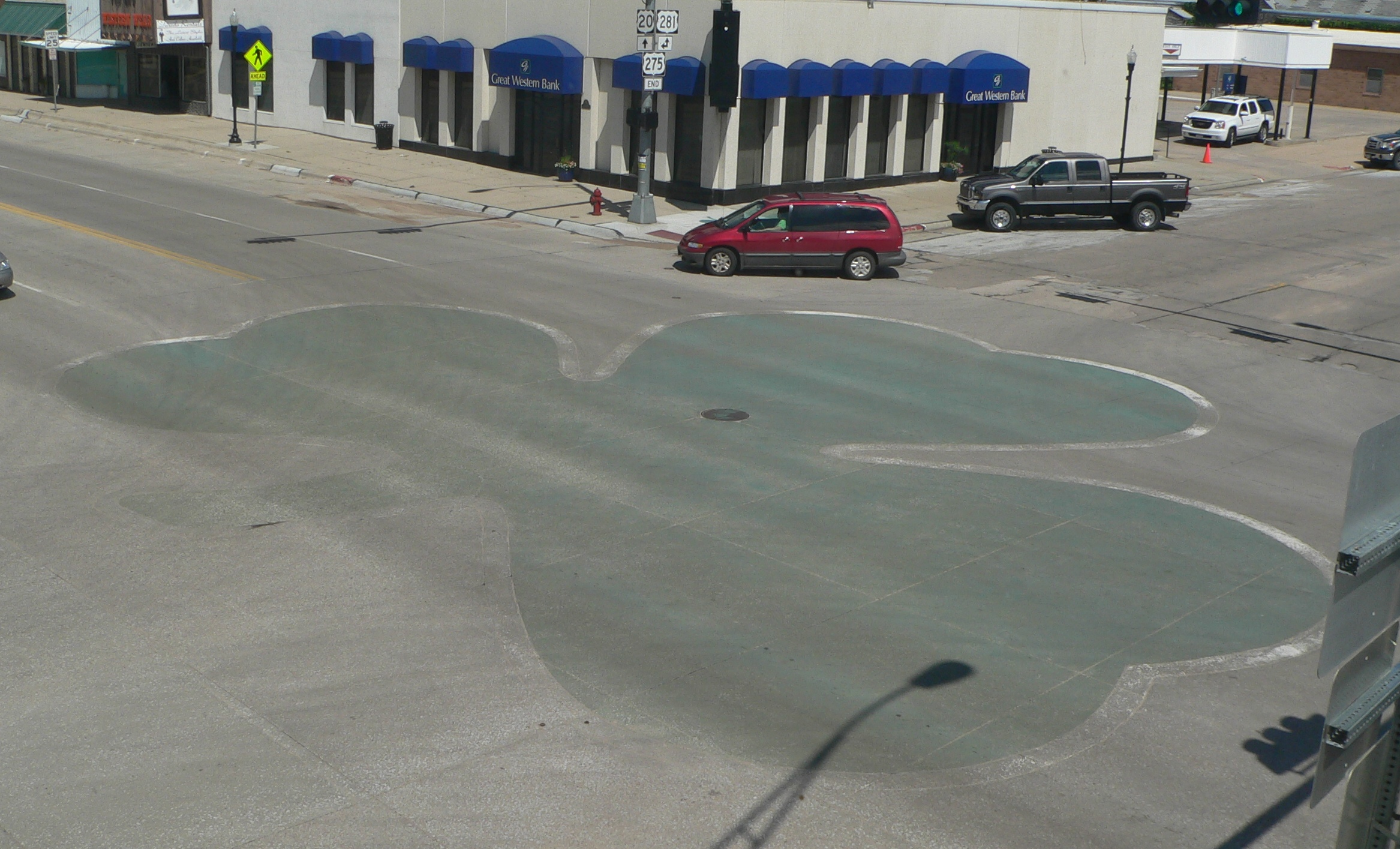
- Shamrock painted on pavement at 4th and Douglas

- Location of O'Neill, Nebraska
- Coordinates: 42°27′40″N 98°38′47″W
- Country: United States
- State: Nebraska
- County: Holt
- Incorporated: 1882

Area
  - Total: 2.39 sq mi (6.18 km^{2})
  - Land: 2.39 sq mi (6.18 km^{2})
  - Water: 0 sq mi (0.00 km^{2})
- Elevation: 2,001 ft (610 m)

Population (2020)
  - Total: 3,581
  - Density: 1,501.2/sq mi (579.61/km^{2})
- Time zone: UTC-6 (Central (CST))
  - Summer (DST): UTC-5 (CDT)
- ZIP code: 68763
- Area code: 402
- FIPS code: 31-37105
- GNIS feature ID: 838176
- Website: cityofoneillnebraska.com

O'Neill is a city in Holt County, Nebraska, United States. As of the 2020 census, O'Neill had a population of 3,581. It is the county seat of Holt County.

== History ==
O'Neill was platted in 1874. It was named for one of its founders, John O'Neill. O'Neill was originally settled largely by Irish immigrants.

The town was incorporated in 1882.

== Geography ==
According to the United States Census Bureau, the city has a total area of 2.38 square miles (6.16 km^{2}), all land.

O'Neill is the official Irish capital of Nebraska. Cattle, potatoes, tomatoes, soybeans and corn are the major products produced near this town.

=== Climate ===
Climate data for O'Neill, Nebraska (1991–2020 normals, extremes 1896–present)
Month	Jan	Feb	Mar	Apr	May	Jun	Jul	Aug	Sep	Oct	Nov	Dec	Year
Record high °F (°C)	72 (22)	77 (25)	91 (33)	96 (36)	107 (42)	108 (42)	112 (44)	110 (43)	107 (42)	96 (36)	82 (28)	76 (24)	112 (44)
Mean maximum °F (°C)	57.0 (13.9)	61.7 (16.5)	74.6 (23.7)	83.3 (28.5)	90.1 (32.3)	95.6 (35.3)	100.6 (38.1)	98.6 (37.0)	94.0 (34.4)	85.1 (29.5)	72.6 (22.6)	58.1 (14.5)	101.7 (38.7)
Mean daily maximum °F (°C)	31.9 (−0.1)	35.8 (2.1)	47.4 (8.6)	58.1 (14.5)	69.7 (20.9)	81.1 (27.3)	87.3 (30.7)	84.7 (29.3)	76.7 (24.8)	61.5 (16.4)	46.6 (8.1)	34.3 (1.3)	59.6 (15.3)
Daily mean °F (°C)	21.5 (−5.8)	24.7 (−4.1)	35.4 (1.9)	46.0 (7.8)	57.7 (14.3)	68.9 (20.5)	74.6 (23.7)	72.1 (22.3)	63.2 (17.3)	48.8 (9.3)	35.0 (1.7)	24.4 (−4.2)	47.7 (8.7)
Mean daily minimum °F (°C)	11.0 (−11.7)	13.7 (−10.2)	23.4 (−4.8)	33.9 (1.1)	45.7 (7.6)	56.7 (13.7)	61.8 (16.6)	59.4 (15.2)	49.6 (9.8)	36.1 (2.3)	23.5 (−4.7)	14.5 (−9.7)	35.8 (2.1)
Mean minimum °F (°C)	−10.1 (−23.4)	−6.3 (−21.3)	2.7 (−16.3)	19.2 (−7.1)	31.9 (−0.1)	45.0 (7.2)	50.8 (10.4)	48.5 (9.2)	34.3 (1.3)	19.3 (−7.1)	5.4 (−14.8)	−5.4 (−20.8)	−14.4 (−25.8)
Record low °F (°C)	−30 (−34)	−34 (−37)	−34 (−37)	−5 (−21)	15 (−9)	34 (1)	39 (4)	37 (3)	19 (−7)	2 (−17)	−19 (−28)	−32 (−36)	−34 (−37)
Average precipitation inches (mm)	0.46 (12)	0.67 (17)	1.51 (38)	2.92 (74)	4.21 (107)	3.48 (88)	3.26 (83)	3.09 (78)	2.35 (60)	2.30 (58)	0.89 (23)	0.71 (18)	25.85 (657)
Average snowfall inches (cm)	4.1 (10)	5.8 (15)	4.7 (12)	1.7 (4.3)	0.4 (1.0)	0.0 (0.0)	0.0 (0.0)	0.0 (0.0)	0.0 (0.0)	0.9 (2.3)	2.7 (6.9)	5.3 (13)	25.6 (65)
Average precipitation days (≥ 0.01 in)	3.8	4.6	6.2	8.3	10.9	10.2	7.9	8.5	6.4	6.9	3.5	4.1	81.3
Average snowy days (≥ 0.1 in)	2.2	3.0	2.6	1.0	0.1	0.0	0.0	0.0	0.0	0.5	1.3	2.7	13.4
Source: NOAA

O'Neill was the venue for one of the first boundary layer experiments, Project Prairie Grass. It was conducted during the summer of 1956 and funded by the Geophysics Directorate of the Air Force Cambridge Research Center. The experiment measured the diffusion of a tracer and the state of turbulence in the lower boundary layer of the atmosphere. Teams from Massachusetts Institute of Technology, University of Wisconsin, Texas A and M, and the Air Force Cambridge lab were involved.

== Demographics ==
Historical population
Census	Pop.	Note	%±
1880	57		—
1890	1,226		2,050.9%
1900	1,107		−9.7%
1910	2,089		88.7%
1920	2,107		0.9%
1930	2,019		−4.2%
1940	2,532		25.4%
1950	3,027		19.5%
1960	3,181		5.1%
1970	3,753		18.0%
1980	4,049		7.9%
1990	3,852		−4.9%
2000	3,733		−3.1%
2010	3,705		−0.8%
2020	3,581		−3.3%
U.S. Decennial Census; 2012 Estimate

=== 2020 census ===
As of the 2020 census, O'Neill had a population of 3,581. The median age was 39.8 years. 24.6% of residents were under the age of 18, and 20.6% of residents were 65 years of age or older. For every 100 females, there were 96.0 males, and for every 100 females age 18 and over, there were 93.6 males age 18 and over.

0.0% of residents lived in urban areas, while 100.0% lived in rural areas.

There were 1,515 households in O'Neill, of which 28.1% had children under the age of 18 living in them. Of all households, 47.7% were married-couple households, 19.5% were households with a male householder and no spouse or partner present, and 27.4% were households with a female householder and no spouse or partner present. About 35.3% of all households were made up of individuals, and 17.3% had someone living alone who was 65 years of age or older.

There were 1,708 housing units, of which 11.3% were vacant. The homeowner vacancy rate was 1.6%, and the rental vacancy rate was 9.6%.

Racial composition as of the 2020 census
Race	Number	Percent
White	3,212	89.7%
Black or African American	24	0.7%
American Indian and Alaska Native	25	0.7%
Asian	28	0.8%
Native Hawaiian and Other Pacific Islander	1	0.0%
Some other race	145	4.0%
Two or more races	146	4.1%
Hispanic or Latino (of any race)	304	8.5%

=== 2010 census ===
At the 2010 census there were 3,705 people in 1,593 households, including 970 families, in the city. The population density was 1,556.7 inhabitants per square mile (601.0/km^{2}). There were 1,778 housing units at an average density of 747.1 per square mile (288.5/km^{2}). The racial makup of the city was 94.2% White, 0.2% African American, 0.5% Native American, 0.2% Asian, 0.2% Pacific Islander, 3.9% from other races, and 0.8% from two or more races. Hispanic or Latino of any race were 6.5%.

Of the 1,593 households 28.4% had children under the age of 18 living with them, 49.1% were married couples living together, 8.6% had a female householder with no husband present, 3.2% had a male householder with no wife present, and 39.1% were non-families. 34.6% of households were one person and 17.3% were one person aged 65 or older. The average household size was 2.28 and the average family size was 2.94.

The median age was 42.8 years. 24.8% of residents were under the age of 18; 6.5% were between the ages of 18 and 24; 20.9% were from 25 to 44; 27.5% were from 45 to 64; and 20.2% were 65 or older. The gender makeup of the city was 48.4% male and 51.6% female.

=== 2000 census ===
At the 2000 census, there were 3,733 people in 1,554 households, including 988 families, in the city. The population density was 1,580.7 inhabitants per square mile (610.3/km^{2}). There were 1,740 housing units at an average density of 736.8 per square mile (284.5/km^{2}). The racial makup of the city was 98.53% White, 0.03% African American, 0.43% Native American, 0.16% Asian, 0.40% from other races, and 0.46% from two or more races. Hispanic or Latino of any race were 1.18% of the population.

Of the 1,554 households 30.4% had children under the age of 18 living with them, 54.0% were married couples living together, 7.7% had a female householder with no husband present, and 36.4% were non-families. 33.8% of households were one person and 17.8% were one person aged 65 or older. The average household size was 2.33 and the average family size was 3.01.

The age distribution was 26.7% under the age of 18, 5.7% from 18 to 24, 24.8% from 25 to 44, 20.4% from 45 to 64, and 22.3% 65 or older. The median age was 40 years. For every 100 females, there were 84.1 males. For every 100 females age 18 and over, there were 80.9 males.

The median household income was $30,815 and the median family income was $40,063. Males had a median income of $28,614 versus $18,627 for females. The per capita income for the city was $15,998. About 5.0% of families and 8.5% of the population were below the poverty line, including 3.4% of those under age 18 and 12.3% of those age 65 or over.

== Arts and culture ==
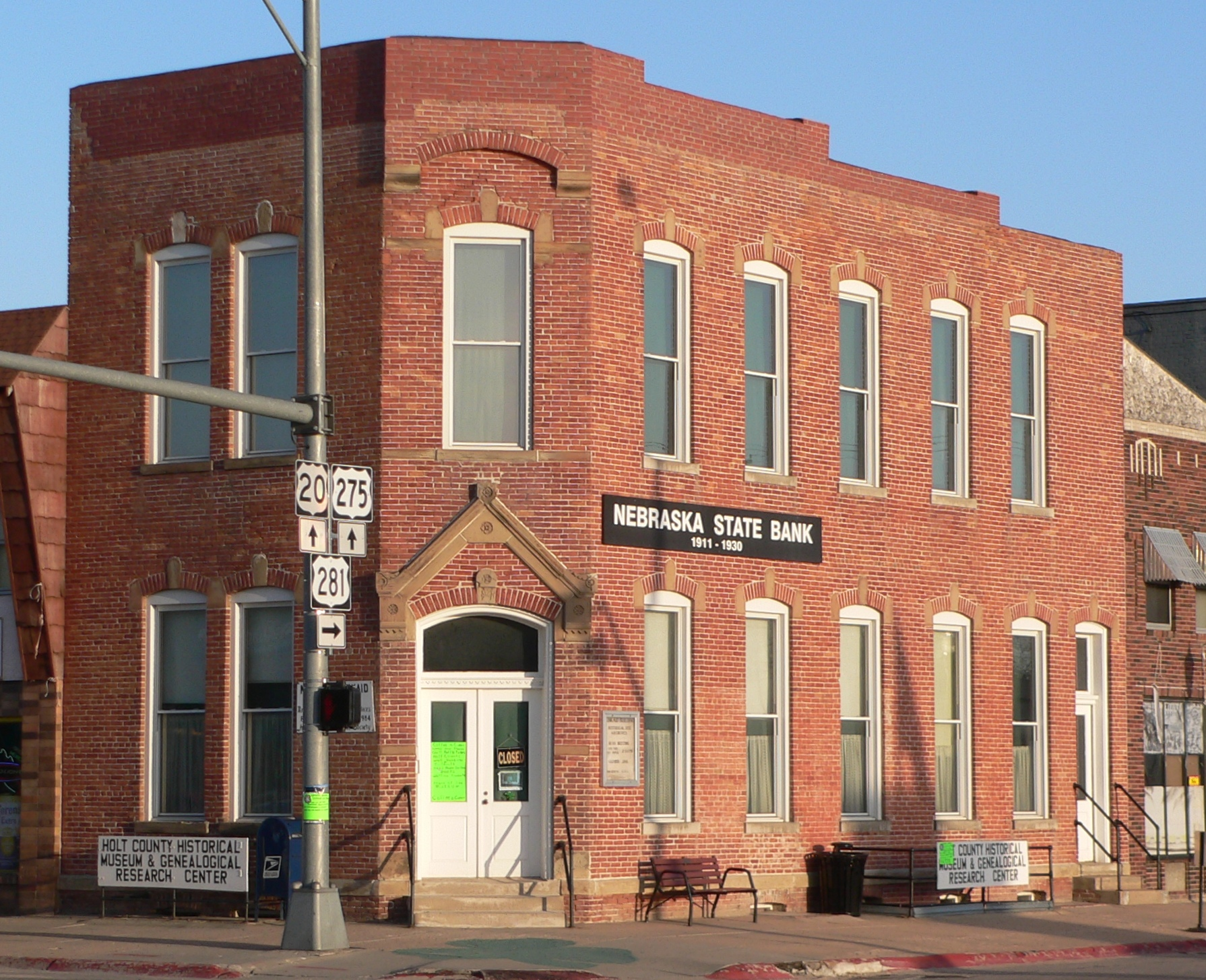
The old Nebraska State Bank building is now the Holt County Historical Museum. Moses Kinkaid's office, now restored, occupied the second floor of the building.

=== Annual cultural events ===
Saint Patrick's Day and the Summerfest in July are the town's main celebrations.

=== Museums and other points of interest ===
O'Neill houses the world's largest permanent shamrock. Made of colored concrete, it was installed in the main intersection of 4th & Douglas in 2000. Due to high traffic, each year the town repaints the shamrock for St. Patrick's Day as part of the town's celebration.

== Education ==
O'Neill has three high schools: St. Mary's Catholic School, O'Neill Public Jr/Sr. High School, and Word of Life Christian School.

== Media ==
The Holt County Independent is O'Neill's local newspaper.

The local radio station is KBRX, 102.9FM, 1350AM. The FM band plays country music along with all the local news from the surrounding towns, while the AM band plays classic rock with a polka ("milking music") hour in the morning.

== Infrastructure ==
=== Transportation ===
Until 1992, O'Neill was served by the Chicago and North Western Transportation Company. The line, known as the "Cowboy Line", ran from Norfolk, Nebraska to Chadron. The line has since been removed and "railbanked"; it is now part of the Cowboy Trail, the longest bike trail in Nebraska.

O'Neill is also served by a former Chicago, Burlington & Quincy branch line from the Sioux City, Iowa vicinity. This line is now operated as the Nebraska Northeastern Railway.

The highways which go through O'Neill include U.S. Highway 20, U.S. Highway 275, and U.S. Highway 281.

== Notable people ==
- Clayton Danks (1879–1970), three-time Cheyenne Frontier Days rodeo winner, model of Wyoming cowboy symbol; born in O'Neill in 1879
- Helen Duhamel (1904–1991), Rapid City, South Dakota, businesswoman and broadcaster, attended St. Mary's Catholic School in O'Neill
- Father Edward Flanagan, who established Boys Town, first served as a Catholic priest at St. Patrick's Catholic Church in O'Neill
- Mike Johanns, U.S. Senator, started career as attorney in O'Neill
- Thomas Kearns, U.S. Senator, Utah mining, banking and railroad magnate, owner of Salt Lake Tribune, an O'Neill native
- Moses Kinkaid, resident, Republican U.S. Representative from Nebraska and sponsor of Kinkaid Act, expanding the amount of land to be granted for homesteading plots
- Debra Kolste, Wisconsin State Assembly member since 2013, was born in O'Neill
- Frank Leahy, football coach at Notre Dame, member of College Football Hall of Fame, was born in O'Neill
- John O'Neill, Irish-born officer in American Civil War, member of Fenian Brotherhood; led Fenian raids on Canada in 1866 and 1871
- Harry Owens, bandleader and Academy Award-winning songwriter, was born in O'Neill
- Jake Peetz, offensive assistant coach of NFL's Seattle Seahawks, is a native of O'Neill
