= KZLK =

Coordinates: 44.069°N 103.251°W

- Rapid City, South Dakota; United States
- Broadcast area: Rapid City metropolitan area
- Frequency: 106.3 MHz
- Branding: Z106.3

Programming
- Language: English
- Format: 1980's hits
- Affiliations: Westwood One

Ownership
- Owner: Carolyn and Doyle Becker; (Riverfront Broadcasting, LLC)
- Sister stations: KQRQ; KZZI; KDDX; KOTA

History
- First air date: September 13, 2001

Technical information
- Licensing authority: FCC
- Facility ID: 76967
- Class: C1
- ERP: 100,000 watts
- HAAT: 212 meters (696 ft)

Links
- Public license information: Public file; LMS
- Webcast: Listen live
- Website: www.all80sz1063.com

KZLK (106.3 FM, "Z106.3") is a commercial radio station licensed to Rapid City, South Dakota. As of January 1, 2019, the station is owned by Riverfront Broadcasting, LLC of Yankton, South Dakota. It broadcasta a 1980s hits radio format.

== History ==
In March 2018, the station rebranded from She 106.3 to Star 106.3, with no change in format.

On June 1, 2020, at 7 a.m., after stunting with songs and clips from Sesame Street about the letter "Z", KZLK changed their format from hot adult contemporary to 1980s hits, branded as "Z106.3". The station launched with a recreation of the script from the 1983 launch of a CHR in New York City, NY, as well as a montage of era-centric events and clips of other Rapid City CHRs popular during the 1980s, such as KKLS and KGGG.
