= Battle of the Ravine =

College football rivalry

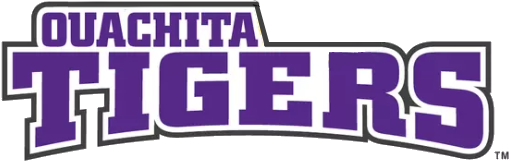
- Henderson State Reddies Ouachita Baptist Tigers
- Sport: Football
- First meeting: November 28, 1895; Ouachita Baptist, 8–0 (Note: The 1895 game was unsanctioned. The first game to count in the all-time series was played in 1907, which was won by Henderson State 22–6)
- Latest meeting: November 14, 2026; Ouachita Baptist, 35–33
- Next meeting: November 2027

Statistics
- Total meetings: 99 (Note: 100 counting the 1895 game)
- All-time series: Ouachita Baptist University, 48–45–6 (.515) (Note: 49–45–6 (.520) counting the 1895 game)
- Largest victory: Ouachita Baptist, 66–0 (1919)
- Longest win streak: Henderson State, 7 (1989–1998)
- Current win streak: Ouachita Baptist, 1 (2026–present)

Locations in Arkadelphia

The Battle of the Ravine is an American college football rivalry game played annually by Henderson State University and Ouachita Baptist University. The football rivalry game is tied for the oldest rivalry game in NCAA Division II, alongside the Black Hills Brawl. The current, full title is the "Southern Bancorp Battle of the Ravine".

In its earliest days, the game was played on Thanksgiving Day, but now it is played as the last game on each team's schedule. It is a unique rivalry in that the two schools located in Arkadelphia, Arkansas are across the street from each other and the visiting team walks from their own locker room to the other team's stadium. Ouachita Baptist currently leads the series 48–45–6.

== Game results ==
Henderson State victories	Ouachita Baptist victories	Tie games

No.	Date	Location	Winner	Score
1	November 28, 1895	unknown	Ouachita Baptist	8–0
2	1907	unknown	Henderson State	22–6
3	November 26, 1908	unknown	Henderson State	42–0
4	November 25, 1909	unknown	Henderson State	38–0
5	November 25, 1910	unknown	Henderson State	9–0
6	November 30, 1911	Arkadelphia, AR	Henderson State	11–0
7	November 28, 1912	unknown	Henderson State	13–0
8	November 20, 1914	unknown	Tie	0–0
9	November 12, 1915	Arkadelphia, AR	Ouachita Baptist	34–7
10	November 30, 1916	Arkadelphia, AR	Ouachita Baptist	31–0
11	1918	unknown	Henderson State	7–0
12	1919	unknown	Ouachita Baptist	66–0
13	1920	unknown	Ouachita Baptist	3–0
14	November 24, 1921	Arkadelphia, AR	Ouachita Baptist	14–0
15	November 30, 1922	Arkadelphia, AR	Ouachita Baptist	8–0
16	November 29, 1923	Arkadelphia, AR	Henderson State	26–6
17	November 27, 1924	Arkadelphia, AR	Ouachita Baptist	12–0
18	November 26, 1925	Arkadelphia, AR	Ouachita Baptist	46–7
19	1926	unknown	Ouachita Baptist	14–7
20	1927	unknown	Tie	6–6
21	November 29, 1928	Arkadelphia, AR	Henderson State	21–0
22	November 28, 1929	Arkadelphia, AR	Henderson State	46–0
23	November 27, 1930	Arkadelphia, AR	Henderson State	13–6
24	October 30, 1931	Conway, AR	Ouachita Baptist	12–0
25	1932	unknown	Henderson State	62–0
26	November 30, 1933	Arkadelphia, AR	Henderson State	21–6
27	1934	unknown	Ouachita Baptist	7–0
28	1935	unknown	Ouachita Baptist	19–0
29	November 18, 38	Arkadelphia, AR	Ouachita Baptist	19–6
30	December 8, 1939	Arkadelphia, AR	Henderson State	3–0
31	September 20, 1940	Arkadelphia, AR	Ouachita Baptist	20–7
32	December 6, 1940	Arkadelphia, AR	Ouachita Baptist	20–0
33	September 27, 41	Arkadelphia, AR	Ouachita Baptist	7–0
34	November 27, 1941	Arkadelphia, AR	Ouachita Baptist	7–0
35	1945	unknown	Henderson State	21–0
36	1945	unknown	Ouachita Baptist	6–0
37	1946	unknown	Ouachita Baptist	26–14
38	November 27, 1947	Arkadelphia, AR	Tie	0–0
39	November 25, 1948	Arkadelphia, AR	Ouachita Baptist	20–7
40	November 24, 1949	Arkadelphia, AR	Ouachita Baptist	17–14
41	November 23, 1950	Arkadelphia, AR	Henderson State	7–0
42	1951	unknown	Henderson State	54–0
43	November 28, 1963	Arkadelphia, AR	Henderson State	28–13
44	November 26, 1964	unknown	Tie	6–6
45	November 25, 1965	unknown	Henderson State	7–0
46	November 19, 1966	unknown	Ouachita Baptist	33–21
47	November 18, 1967	Arkadelphia, AR	Ouachita Baptist	29–17
48	November 23, 1968	Arkadelphia, AR	Henderson State	16–0
49	November 22, 1969	unknown	Henderson State	23–17
50	November 21, 1970	unknown	Ouachita Baptist	36–0

No.	Date	Location	Winner	Score
51	November 20, 1971	unknown	Ouachita Baptist	21–14
52	November 18, 1972	unknown	Ouachita Baptist	15–14
53	November 17, 1973	Arkadelphia, AR	Henderson State	23–7
54	November 23, 1974	Arkadelphia, AR	Henderson State	28–7
55	November 22, 1975	unknown	Ouachita Baptist	21–20
56	November 20, 1976	unknown	Henderson State	18–3
57	November 17, 1977	unknown	Henderson State	17–16
58	November 18, 1978	Arkadelphia, AR	Henderson State	7–6
59	November 17, 1979	Arkadelphia, AR	Henderson State	28–21
60	November 22, 1980	Arkadelphia, AR	Ouachita Baptist	28–21
61	November 21, 1981	Arkadelphia, AR	Ouachita Baptist	17–13
62	November 20, 1982	Arkadelphia, AR	Ouachita Baptist	19–18
63	November 19, 1983	Arkadelphia, AR	Ouachita Baptist	19–16
64	November 17, 1984	Arkadelphia, AR	Ouachita Baptist	24–22
65	November 23, 1985	Arkadelphia, AR	Henderson State	33–19
66	November 22, 1986	Arkadelphia, AR	Tie	10–10
67	November 21, 1987	Arkadelphia, AR	Ouachita Baptist	18–3
68	November 19, 1988	Arkadelphia, AR	Tie	3–3
69	November 18, 1989	Arkadelphia, AR	Henderson State	20–14
70	October 27, 1990	Arkadelphia, AR	Henderson State	34–20
71	November 2, 1991	Arkadelphia, AR	Henderson State	21–7
72	October 31, 1992	Arkadelphia, AR	Henderson State	35–23
73	September 7, 1996	Arkadelphia, AR	Henderson State	21–17
74	September 6, 1997	Arkadelphia, AR	Henderson State	36–23
75	September 5, 1998	Arkadelphia, AR	Henderson State	24–3
76	September 4, 1999	Arkadelphia, AR	Ouachita Baptist	34–14
77	September 2, 2000	Arkadelphia, AR	Henderson State	16–9
78	September 1, 2001	Arkadelphia, AR	Ouachita Baptist	41–13
79	November 2, 2002	Arkadelphia, AR	Ouachita Baptist	28–14
80	November 1, 2003	Arkadelphia, AR	Ouachita Baptist	35–17
81	November 4, 2006	Arkadelphia, AR	Henderson State	48–28
82	November 1, 2007	Arkadelphia, AR	Henderson State	18–0
83	November 6, 2008	Arkadelphia, AR	Ouachita Baptist	43–36
84	November 7, 2009	Arkadelphia, AR	Ouachita Baptist	35–28
85	October 30, 2010	Arkadelphia, AR	Henderson State	35–26
86	November 12, 2011	Arkadelphia, AR	Henderson State	41–36
87	November 10, 2012	Arkadelphia, AR	Henderson State	42–7
88	November 16, 2013	Arkadelphia, AR	Henderson State	60–52
89	November 15, 2014	Arkadelphia, AR	Ouachita Baptist	41–20
90	November 14, 2015	Arkadelphia, AR	Henderson State	21–17
91	November 12, 2016	Arkadelphia, AR	Ouachita Baptist	30–27
92	November 11, 2017	Arkadelphia, AR	Ouachita Baptist	49–42
93	November 10, 2018	Arkadelphia, AR	Ouachita Baptist	38–10
94	November 16, 2019	Arkadelphia, AR	Ouachita Baptist	24–21
95	November 13, 2021	Arkadelphia, AR	Ouachita Baptist	31–28
96	November 12, 2022	Arkadelphia, AR	Ouachita Baptist	40–37
97	November 11, 2023	Arkadelphia, AR	Henderson State	31–27
98	November 16, 2024	Arkadelphia, AR	Ouachita Baptist	27–20
99	November 15, 2025	Arkadelphia, AR	Henderson State	41–14
100	November 14, 2026	Arkadelphia, AR	Ouachita Baptist	35–33

== See also ==
- List of NCAA college football rivalry games
- Battle of 33rd Street, an NCAA Division I basketball rivalry that also involves schools with adjacent campuses
