= KQRQ =

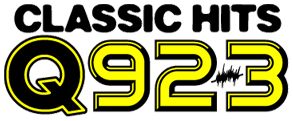
- Rapid City, South Dakota; United States
- Broadcast area: Rapid City, South Dakota
- Frequency: 92.3 MHz
- Branding: Q92.3

Programming
- Format: Classic hits
- Affiliations: United Stations Radio Networks

Ownership
- Owner: Riverfront Broadcasting, LLC
- Sister stations: KZZI, KDDX, KZLK, KOTA

History
- First air date: 2002

Technical information
- Licensing authority: FCC
- Facility ID: 78167
- Class: C1
- ERP: 100,000 watts
- HAAT: 177 meters
- Transmitter coordinates: 44°4′7″N 103°15′2″W

Links
- Public license information: Public file; LMS
- Webcast: Listen Live
- Website: q923radio.com

KQRQ (92.3 FM, branded on-air as Q92.3) is a radio station that airs a classic hits format in Rapid City, South Dakota.
