= KDDX =

- Spearfish, South Dakota; United States
- Broadcast area: Rapid City, South Dakota
- Frequency: 101.1 MHz
- Branding: X Rock

Programming
- Format: Active rock
- Affiliations: United Stations Radio Networks

Ownership
- Owner: Riverfront Broadcasting, LLC
- Sister stations: KOTA, KQRQ, KZLK, KZZI

History
- First air date: 1985 (as KEZV)
- Former call signs: KEZV (1983–1995)

Technical information
- Licensing authority: FCC
- Facility ID: 17689
- Class: C
- ERP: 100,000 watts
- HAAT: 545 meters (1788 feet)
- Transmitter coordinates: 44°19′35″N 103°50′6″W
- Translator: 103.7 K279DF (Rapid City)

Links
- Public license information: Public file; LMS
- Webcast: Listen Live
- Website: xrock.fm

KDDX (101.1 FM, "X Rock") is a radio station licensed to serve Spearfish, South Dakota. The station is owned by Riverfront Broadcasting, LLC. It airs an active rock music format. With a 100,000 watt signal on a nearly 1,800 foot tall tower, the station covers much of western South Dakota (including Rapid City), and the Gillette/Northeast Wyoming area.

The station was assigned the KDDX call letters by the Federal Communications Commission on April 28, 1995.

== Translator ==
Broadcast translator for KDDX
Call sign	Frequency	City of license	FID	ERP (W)	Class	FCC info
K279DF	103.7 FM	Rapid City, South Dakota	17677	275	D	LMS
