= Black Hills Brawl =

American college football rivalry

- Sport: Football
- Teams: Black Hills State Yellow Jackets; South Dakota Mines Hardrockers
- First meeting: November 28, 1895 (disputed); 1900 (official); Black Hills State 18–0 (disputed); South Dakota Mines 1–0 (official)
- Latest meeting: October 17, 2026; Black Hills State, 21–13
- Next meeting: 2027, Spearfish
- Stadiums: Black Hills State: Lyle Hare Stadium; South Dakota Mines: Dunham Field at O'Harra Stadium
- Trophy: Homestake Trophy

Statistics
- Total meetings: 141
- All-time series: South Dakota Mines leads, 67–63–11
- Largest victory: Black Hills State, 58–0 on October 6, 2007
- Longest win streak: South Dakota Mines, 9 (November 29, 1906, to October 7, 1916)
- Current win streak: Black Hills State, 1 (2026–present)

The Black Hills Brawl is an annual football game between Black Hills State University and South Dakota School of Mines and Technology. Also known as The Battle for the Homestake Trophy or rarely called the West River Rivalry, the winner of the game receives the Homestake Trophy. The current venues the game is played in are Lyle Hare Stadium since 1960 (Black Hills State) and O'Harra Stadium since 1938 (South Dakota Mines). First played in 1895 and played 140 times, the Black Hills Brawl is the most played in NCAA Division II and tied for the oldest rivalry in DII (alongside the Battle of the Ravine); it is the 4th most played rivalry nationwide in any division (behind only The Game, Princeton–Yale, and The Rivalry).

Locations of Black Hills State and SD Mines

== First game ==
The first meeting on November 28, 1895, was between SDSM&T (then known as the Dakota School of Mines) and a now-defunct and unrelated Methodist college in Hot Springs known as Black Hills College, after BHSU (then known as Spearfish Normal) turned Black Hills College down. Despite this, both current schools generally include this game in the rivalry's chronology, but do not count it against their records; the first official meeting did not come until 1900.

== Game results ==
Black Hills State victories	South Dakota Mines victories	Tie games

No.	Date	Location	Winner	Score
1	1900	Unknown	South Dakota Mines	27–0
2	1901	Unknown	South Dakota Mines	22–6
3	October 24, 1903	Unknown	South Dakota Mines	10–0
4	October 21, 1905	Unknown	South Dakota Mines	15–0
5	November 3, 1906	Unknown	Tie	0–0
6	November 29, 1906	Unknown	South Dakota Mines	5–0
7	October 24, 1908	Unknown	South Dakota Mines	2–0
8	November 14, 1908	Unknown	South Dakota Mines	13–0
9	October 16, 1909	Unknown	South Dakota Mines	30–6
10	October 12, 1912	Unknown	South Dakota Mines	13–3
11	October 18, 1913	Spearfish, SD	South Dakota Mines	25–0
12	October 17, 1914	Unknown	South Dakota Mines	33–0
13	November 7, 1914	Unknown	South Dakota Mines	6–0
14	October 7, 1916	Unknown	South Dakota Mines	8–2
15	November 18, 1916	Unknown	Black Hills State	13–0
16	October 6, 1917	Unknown	South Dakota Mines	36–6
17	October 19, 1917	Unknown	South Dakota Mines	27–0
18	November 17, 1917	Unknown	South Dakota Mines	19–0
19	October 11, 1919	Unknown	South Dakota Mines	26–0
20	October 9, 1920	Unknown	South Dakota Mines	13–7
21	October 1, 1921	Rapid City, SD	Black Hills State	13–6
22	November 5, 1921	Rapid City, SD	Black Hills State	7–6
23	October 18, 1922	Rapid City, SD	Black Hills State	20–0
24	November 4, 1922	Rapid City, SD	Tie	0–0
25	October 27, 1923	Rapid City, SD	South Dakota Mines	12–0
26	November 17, 1923	Rapid City, SD	South Dakota Mines	13–0
27	October 25, 1924	Rapid City, SD	South Dakota Mines	26–6
28	November 22, 1924	Rapid City, SD	South Dakota Mines	14–3
29	October 23, 1925	Unknown	South Dakota Mines	14–7
30	November 21, 1925	Unknown	Black Hills State	7–0
31	October 8, 1926	Unknown	South Dakota Mines	13–9
32	October 30, 1926	Deadwood, SD	Tie	0–0
33	October 22, 1927	Spearfish, SD	South Dakota Mines	28–0
34	October 29, 1927	Rapid City, SD	South Dakota Mines	12–0
35	October 13, 1928	Rapid City, SD	Black Hills State	6–0
36	October 27, 1928	Spearfish, SD	Black Hills State	13–7
37	October 19, 1929	Rapid City, SD	Black Hills State	7–0
38	November 11, 1929	Rapid City, SD	Black Hills State	6–0
39	October 24, 1930	Rapid City, SD	Black Hills State	44–7
40	September 9, 1932	Rapid City, SD	Black Hills State	7–0
41	October 22, 1932	Spearfish, SD	Black Hills State	27–7
42	October 13, 1933	Rapid City, SD	South Dakota Mines	21–0
43	November 18, 1933	Rapid City, SD	South Dakota Mines	20–0
44	1934	Unknown	Black Hills State	33–0
45	1934	Unknown	Black Hills State	25–0
46	October 25, 1935	Rapid City, SD	Black Hills State	46–6
47	October 17, 1936	Spearfish, SD	Black Hills State	19–6
48	October 24, 1936	Rapid City, SD	Black Hills State	13–12
49	November 11, 1937	Rapid City, SD	South Dakota Mines	7–6
50	November 11, 1938	Spearfish, SD	South Dakota Mines	30–0
51	November 11, 1939	Rapid City, SD	South Dakota Mines	3–0
52	November 11, 1940	Spearfish, SD	Tie	0–0
53	November 11, 1941	Rapid City, SD	South Dakota Mines	32–7
54	October 4, 1946	Rapid City, SD	Black Hills State	6–0
55	November 11, 1946	Spearfish, SD	Black Hills State	13–0
56	October 3, 1947	Spearfish, SD	Tie	0–0
57	November 11, 1947	Rapid City, SD	South Dakota Mines	7–0
58	November 11, 1948	Spearfish, SD	Black Hills State	7–0
59	November 11, 1949	Rapid City, SD	Black Hills State	38–6
60	November 11, 1950	Spearfish, SD	Black Hills State	19–7
61	November 12, 1951	Rapid City, SD	South Dakota Mines	20–7
62	November 11, 1952	Spearfish, SD	South Dakota Mines	26–21
63	November 11, 1953	Rapid City, SD	South Dakota Mines	19–6
64	November 11, 1954	Spearfish, SD	South Dakota Mines	32–26
65	November 11, 1955	Rapid City, SD	Tie	6–6
66	November 12, 1956	Spearfish, SD	Black Hills State	47–7
67	November 11, 1957	Rapid City, SD	Tie	7–7
68	November 11, 1958	Spearfish, SD	Tie	7–7
69	November 11, 1959	Rapid City, SD	South Dakota Mines	20–19
70	November 11, 1960	Spearfish, SD	South Dakota Mines	21–7
71	November 11, 1961	Rapid City, SD	Black Hills State	28–0

No.	Date	Location	Winner	Score
72	October 6, 1962	Spearfish, SD	Black Hills State	6–0
73	October 5, 1963	Rapid City, SD	Black Hills State	27–13
74	October 17, 1964	Rapid City, SD	Tie	20–20
75	October 16, 1965	Rapid City, SD	Black Hills State	20–0
76	October 22, 1966	Spearfish, SD	Black Hills State	13–7
77	October 21, 1967	Unknown	South Dakota Mines	43–14
78	November 2, 1968	Spearfish, SD	South Dakota Mines	27–19
79	November 1, 1969	Unknown	Black Hills State	30–3
80	September 19, 1970	Unknown	Black Hills State	35–14
81	September 18, 1971	Rapid City, SD	South Dakota Mines	10–3
82	September 30, 1972	Unknown	South Dakota Mines	13–6
83	September 29, 1973	Unknown	South Dakota Mines	24–7
84	October 5, 1974	Spearfish, SD	Tie	7–7
85	October 4, 1975	Rapid City, SD	South Dakota Mines	24–6
86	October 9, 1976	Rapid City, SD	Black Hills State	17–7
87	October 8, 1977	Rapid City, SD	South Dakota Mines	41–14
88	September 30, 1978	Spearfish, SD	South Dakota Mines	35–21
89	September 29, 1979	Rapid City, SD	Tie	14–14
90	September 20, 1980	Spearfish, SD	South Dakota Mines	31–0
91	September 19, 1981	Rapid City, SD	South Dakota Mines	35–0
92	September 25, 1982	Spearfish, SD	South Dakota Mines	13–9
93	September 24, 1983	Rapid City, SD	Black Hills State	19–7
94	October 6, 1984	Spearfish, SD	Black Hills State	14–7
95	September 21, 1985	Spearfish, SD	South Dakota Mines	31–8
96	October 26, 1985	Rapid City, SD	South Dakota Mines	31–14
97	October 25, 1986	Spearfish, SD	South Dakota Mines	26–18
98	October 17, 1987	Rapid City, SD	Black Hills State	13–6
99	October 22, 1988	Spearfish, SD	Black Hills State	27–5
100	October 28, 1989	Rapid City, SD	Black Hills State	33–6
101	November 3, 1990	Spearfish, SD	Black Hills State	34–31^{OT}
102	November 2, 1991	Rapid City, SD	South Dakota Mines	40–18
103	October 31, 1992	Spearfish, SD	Black Hills State	34–28
104	October 23, 1993	Rapid City, SD	Black Hills State	41–14
105	October 22, 1994	Spearfish, SD	Black Hills State	29–27
106	October 14, 1995	Rapid City, SD	South Dakota Mines	42–34
107	October 5, 1996	Spearfish, SD	Black Hills State	27–24
108	October 4, 1997	Rapid City, SD	Black Hills State	36–10
109	October 10, 1998	Spearfish, SD	Black Hills State	27–17
110	October 9, 1999	Rapid City, SD	Black Hills State	26–16
111	October 21, 2000	Rapid City, SD	Black Hills State	23–6
112	October 20, 2001	Spearfish, SD	Black Hills State	30–17
113	October 19, 2002	Rapid City, SD	Black Hills State	47–41^{OT}
114	October 18, 2003	Spearfish, SD	South Dakota Mines	29–28
115	September 2, 2004	Spearfish, SD	South Dakota Mines	10–9
116	October 9, 2004	Rapid City, SD	Black Hills State	21–10
117	September 1, 2005	Rapid City, SD	Black Hills State	43–13
118	October 8, 2005	Spearfish, SD	Black Hills State	34–17
119	September 30, 2006	Rapid City, SD	Black Hills State	47–0
120	October 6, 2007	Spearfish, SD	Black Hills State	58–0
121	September 20, 2008	Spearfish, SD	Black Hills State	33–13
122	November 8, 2008	Rapid City, SD	South Dakota Mines	24–23
123	October 31, 2009	Spearfish, SD	Black Hills State	26–0
124	October 30, 2010	Rapid City, SD	South Dakota Mines	23–20^{2OT}
125	September 17, 2011	Rapid City, SD	Black Hills State	37–21
126	November 12, 2011	Spearfish, SD	Black Hills State	48–21
127	November 17, 2012	Spearfish, SD	Black Hills State	35–6
128	September 14, 2013	Rapid City, SD	South Dakota Mines	43–35
129	September 13, 2014	Spearfish, SD	Black Hills State	42–30
130	September 12, 2015	Rapid City, SD	South Dakota Mines	28–26
131	September 24, 2016	Rapid City, SD	South Dakota Mines	46–17
132	September 23, 2017	Spearfish, SD	Black Hills State	25–24
133	October 6, 2018	Rapid City, SD	South Dakota Mines	62–14
134	October 12, 2019	Spearfish, SD	Black Hills State	48–28
135	October 10, 2020	Rapid City, SD	South Dakota Mines	34–17
136	October 30, 2021	Spearfish, SD	South Dakota Mines	13–10
137	October 1, 2022	Rapid City, SD	Black Hills State	24–17
138	September 30, 2023	Spearfish, SD	South Dakota Mines	49–14
139	October 5, 2024	Rapid City, SD	Black Hills State	22–20
140	October 4, 2025	Spearfish, SD	South Dakota Mines	27–13
141	October 17, 2026	Rapid City, SD	Black Hills State	21–13
Series: South Dakota Mines leads 67–63–11

Notes

- SDSM&T was known at the Dakota School of Mines until 1889, when it became the South Dakota School of Mines; it became SDSM&T in 1943.
- BHSU was known as Spearfish Normal until 1941, when it became the Black Hills Teachers College; it would be renamed Black Hills State College in 1964 and BHSU in 1989.

== Men's Basketbrawl ==
Black Hills BasketBrawl
- Sport: Football
- Teams: Black Hills State Yellow Jackets; South Dakota Mines Hardrockers
- First meeting: 1948
- Latest meeting: February 01,2025; Black Hills State, 68-40
- Next meeting: December 2, 2025, Rapid City
- Stadiums: Black Hills State: Donald E. Young Center; South Dakota Mines: King Center; Occasional Neutral Site: Ice Arena at The Monument

Statistics
- Total meetings: 211
- All-time series: Black Hills State leads, 116-95
- Current win streak: Black Hills State, 1

The men's basketball rivalry currently stands at 116–95, in favor of Black Hills State. Below are results where the score is known. The two have played each other since 1948.

Black Hills State victories	South Dakota Mines victories	Tie games

No.	Date	Location	Winner	Score
1	January 7, 1982	Mitchell, SD	South Dakota Mines	93–88
2	January 18, 1982	Rapid City, SD	South Dakota Mines	94–88
3	February 23, 1982	Spearfish, SD	Black Hills State	76–72
4	January 3, 1983	Mitchell, SD	South Dakota Mines	92–85
5	January 18, 1983	Rushmore Plaza Civic Center	South Dakota Mines	99–84
6	February 15, 1983	Rushmore Plaza Civic Center	Black Hills State	80–76
7	January 5, 1984	Mitchell, SD	South Dakota Mines	56–48
8	January 17, 1984	Rushmore Plaza Civic Center	South Dakota Mines	103–89
9	February 8, 1984	Rushmore Plaza Civic Center	South Dakota Mines	74–66
10	January 2, 1985	Mitchell, SD	South Dakota Mines	71–62
11	January 22, 1985	Spearfish, SD	South Dakota Mines	81–57
12	February 12, 1985	Rapid City, SD	South Dakota Mines	98–77
13	January 2, 1986	Mitchell, SD	South Dakota Mines	67–65
14	January 24, 1986	Rapid City, SD	South Dakota Mines	69–67
15	February 14, 1986	Spearfish, SD	South Dakota Mines	98–90
16	January 2, 1987	Mitchell, SD	South Dakota Mines	85–79
17	January 8, 1987	Rapid City, SD	South Dakota Mines	93–78
18	February 5, 1987	Spearfish, SD	Black Hills State	68–56
19	December 4, 1987	Rapid City, SD	Black Hills State	65–61
20	January 21, 1988	Spearfish, SD	Black Hills State	76–74
21	February 11, 1988	Rapid City, SD	Black Hills State	73–57
22	February 28, 1988	Spearfish, SD	South Dakota Mines	95–77
23	January 26, 1989	Rapid City, SD	South Dakota Mines	98–93
24	February 16, 1989	Spearfish, SD	South Dakota Mines	71–70
25	February 22, 1989	Rapid City, SD	Black Hills State	84–64
26	January 4, 1990	Mitchell, SD	Black Hills State	92–76
27	January 25, 1990	Spearfish, SD	Black Hills State	100–76
28	February 15, 1990	Rapid City, SD	Black Hills State	85–69
29	February 25, 1990	Spearfish, SD	Black Hills State	65–64
30	January 3, 1991	Mitchell, SD	Black Hills State	99–97
31	January 24, 1991	Rapid City, SD	South Dakota Mines	87–69
32	February 14, 1991	Spearfish, SD	South Dakota Mines	69–67
33	March 25, 1991	Spearfish, SD	South Dakota Mines	75–71
34	January 2, 1992	Mitchell, SD	South Dakota Mines	68–60
35	January 23, 1992	Rapid City, SD	Black Hills State	73–66
36	February 1, 1992	Spearfish, SD	South Dakota Mines	82–77
37	January 20, 1993	Spearfish, SD	Black Hills State	81–55
38	January 28, 1993	Rapid City, SD	Black Hills State	73–51
39	December 29, 1993	Rapid City, SD	South Dakota Mines	75–72
40	January 15, 1994	Spearfish, SD	Black Hills State	87–57
41	February 3, 1994	Rapid City, SD	South Dakota Mines	80–69
42	December 30, 1994	Spearfish, SD	South Dakota Mines	66–59
43	January 7, 1995	Rapid City, SD	Black Hills State	68–66
44	February 11, 1995	Spearfish, SD	Black Hills State	75–71
45	January 30, 1996	Spearfish, SD	Black Hills State	77–69
46	February 21, 1996	Rapid City, SD	Black Hills State	89–77
47	January 28, 1997	Rapid City, SD	Black Hills State	74–70
48	February 26, 1997	Spearfish, SD	South Dakota Mines	79–76
49	March 1, 1997	Spearfish, SD	South Dakota Mines	68–67
50	January 20, 1998	Spearfish, SD	Black Hills State	61–58
51	February 24, 1998	Rapid City, SD	South Dakota Mines	61–60
52	December 30, 1998	Rapid City, SD	Black Hills State	79–73
53	January 27, 1999	Rapid City, SD	Black Hills State	93–75
54	February 24, 1999	Spearfish, SD	Black Hills State	85–75
55	January 27, 2000	Rapid City, SD	South Dakota Mines	90–80

No.	Date	Location	Winner	Score
56	February 23, 2000	Spearfish, SD	South Dakota Mines	90–89
57	January 6, 2001	Spearfish, SD	Black Hills State	72–64
58	February 1, 2001	Rapid City, SD	South Dakota Mines	84–60
59	January 5, 2002	Rapid City, SD	Black Hills State	93–82
60	January 31, 2002	Spearfish, SD	South Dakota Mines	89–75
61	February 23, 2002	Spearfish, SD	Black Hills State	86–66
62	January 4, 2003	Rapid City, SD	Black Hills State	63–54
63	January 30, 2003	Spearfish, SD	Black Hills State	71–59
64	January 3, 2004	Rapid City, SD	Black Hills State	69–45
65	January 29, 2004	Spearfish, SD	South Dakota Mines	50–49
66	December 9, 2004	Spearfish, SD	South Dakota Mines	67–65
67	January 20, 2005	Rapid City, SD	South Dakota Mines	66–64
68	December 8, 2005	Rapid City, SD	Black Hills State	93–74
69	January 19, 2006	Spearfish, SD	Black Hills State	75–65
70	December 6, 2006	Spearfish, SD	South Dakota Mines	71–59
71	February 15, 2007	Rapid City, SD	Black Hills State	85–67
72	December 5, 2007	Rapid City, SD	Black Hills State	70–57
73	February 20, 2008	Spearfish, SD	Black Hills State	81–70
74	January 15, 2009	Rapid City, SD	Black Hills State	64–57
75	February 11, 2009	Spearfish, SD	Black Hills State	71–53
76	February 25, 2009	Rapid City, SD	South Dakota Mines	77–67
77	December 3, 2009	Spearfish, SD	South Dakota Mines	63–62
78	January 28, 2010	Rapid City, SD	Black Hills State	81–71
79	December 1, 2010	Rapid City, SD	Black Hills State	80–61
80	January 27, 2011	Spearfish, SD	South Dakota Mines	76–74
81	March 1, 2011	Spearfish, SD	Black Hills State	75–63
82	January 24, 2012	Rapid City, SD	Black Hills State	76–60
83	February 15, 2012	Spearfish, SD	South Dakota Mines	64–58
84	November 20, 2012	Spearfish, SD	South Dakota Mines	69–61
85	November 20, 2013	Spearfish, SD	South Dakota Mines	72–68
86	January 11, 2014	Rapid City, SD	South Dakota Mines	61–49
87	November 17, 2014	Spearfish, SD	Black Hills State	72–67
88	January 9, 2015	Rapid City, SD	South Dakota Mines	73–70
89	December 3, 2015	Spearfish, SD	South Dakota Mines	78–73
90	February 24, 2016	Rapid City, SD	South Dakota Mines	55–53
91	January 17, 2017	Rushmore Plaza Civic Center	South Dakota Mines	65–54
92	February 11, 2017	Spearfish, SD	South Dakota Mines	78–59
93	January 16, 2018	Spearfish, SD	Black Hills State	92–69
94	February 6, 2018	Rapid City, SD	Black Hills State	66–65
95	December 1, 2018	Rapid City, SD	Black Hills State	57–56
96	March 1, 2019	Spearfish, SD	Black Hills State	69–61
97	November 26, 2019	Spearfish, SD	Black Hills State	70–66
98	February 28, 2020	Rapid City, SD	Black Hills State	59–58
99	March 3, 2020	Spearfish, SD	South Dakota Mines	80–71
100	January 23, 2021	Rapid City, SD	South Dakota Mines	79–78
101	January 20, 2022	Spearfish, SD	Black Hills State	86–65
102	February 19, 2022	Rapid City, SD	Black Hills State	79–65
103	November 28, 2022	Rapid City, SD	Black Hills State	78–58
104	January 24, 2023	Spearfish, SD	Black Hills State	76–60
105	November 27, 2023	Spearfish, SD	South Dakota Mines	77–69
106	January 31, 2024	Rapid City, SD	South Dakota Mines	59–54
107	December 03, 2024	Rapid City, SD	South Dakota Mines	58–50
108	February 01,2024	Spearfish, SD	Black Hills State	68–40
109				
Series: Tied 54–54

== See also ==
- List of NCAA college football rivalry games
