= South Dakota Mines Hardrockers =

- University: South Dakota School of Mines and Technology
- Nickname: Hardrockers
- NCAA: Division II
- Conference: Rocky Mountain Athletic Conference
- Athletic director: Joel Lueken
- Location: Rapid City, South Dakota
- Varsity teams: 11
- Football stadium: O'Harra Stadium
- Basketball arena: King Center
- Soccer stadium: Sioux Park Stadium
- Colors: Navy blue and Vegas gold
- Mascot: Grubby the Miner
- Website: gorockers.com

The South Dakota Mines Hardrockers (also referred to as the SDSMT Hardrockers, SDSM&T Hardrockers, and anachronistically the South Dakota Tech Hardrockers) are the athletic teams that represent South Dakota School of Mines and Technology, located in Rapid City, South Dakota, in Division II intercollegiate sports of the National Collegiate Athletic Association (NCAA). The Hardrockers primarily compete as a member of the Rocky Mountain Athletic Conference for all 11 varsity sports.

The men's soccer team competed in the Great Northwest Athletic Conference (GNAC) from the 2013 to the 2014 fall seasons, and football, which also joined the GNAC from the 2014 to the 2015 fall seasons.

On January 20, 2014, South Dakota Mines had accepted an invitation to join the RMAC; most Hardrockers teams joined the RMAC on July 1, 2014 while men's soccer and football moved from the GNAC after the 2014 and 2015 fall seasons respectively.

== History ==
The South Dakota Mines (SDSM&T) athletic teams are called the Hardrockers, coming from its mining background. Miners would use a rocker box as a more efficient means of panning for gold. The history of the athletic programs stretch back to 1895 when the first school football team formed, originally named the "Longhairs."

The Hardrockers formerly competed as members of the Dakota Athletic Conference (DAC) of the National Association of Intercollegiate Athletics (NAIA) from 2000–01 to 2010–11, and were former members of the South Dakota Intercollegiate Conference (SDIC) (also from the NAIA) until after the 1999–2000 school year. South Dakota Mines completed the transition form the NAIA to the NCAA in July 2013.

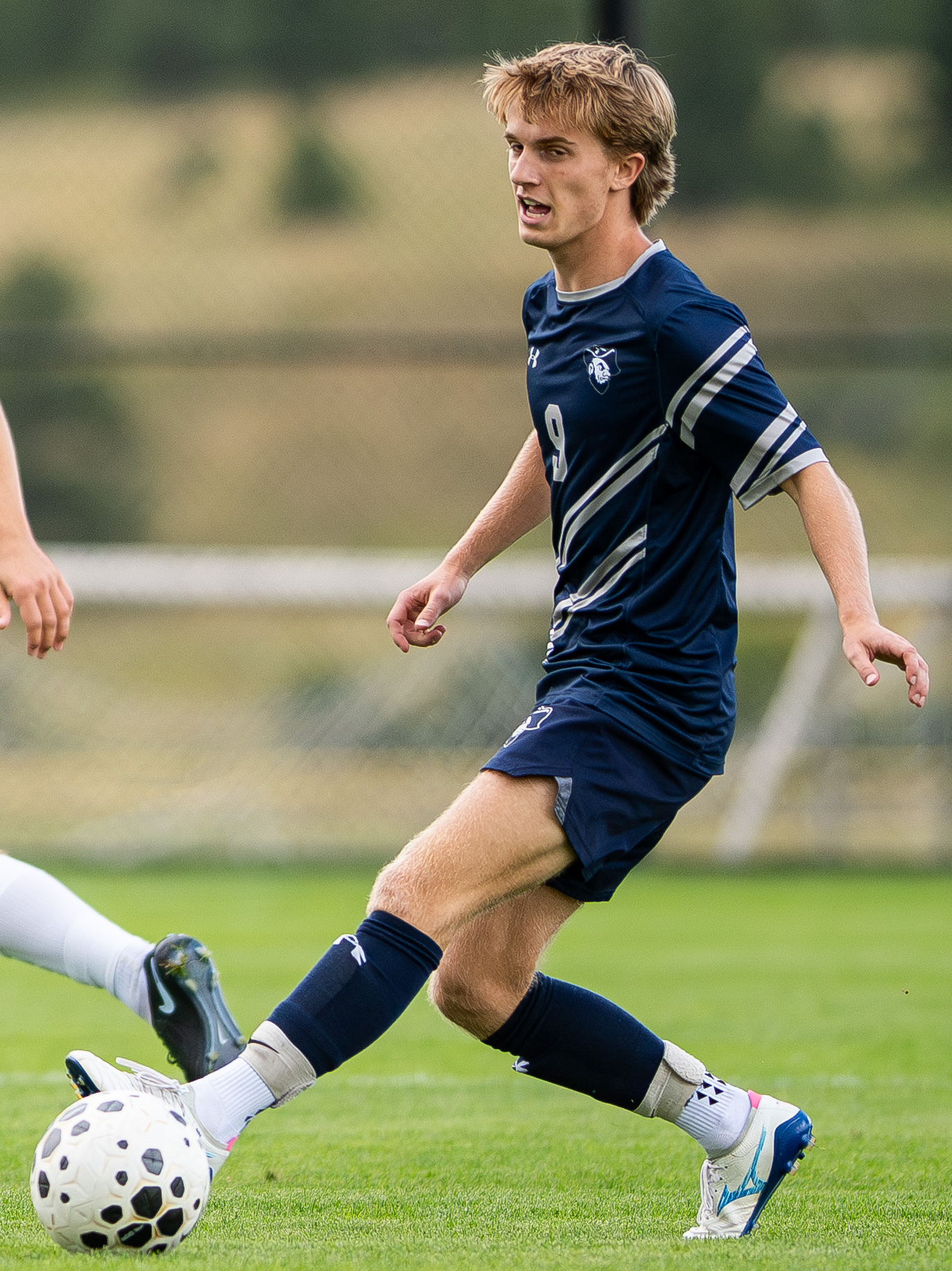
A Hardrockers men's soccer player during a game in 2025

South Dakota Mines' chief rival is Black Hills State University, located less than 50 miles away in Spearfish, South Dakota. The last football game of the regular season between the two schools is called the Black Hills Brawl, whose winner gets the traveling Homestake Trophy. The Hardrockers' other current rivalries include Colorado School of Mines and Chadron State College. The Eagle-Rock Trophy was created in 2016 to commemorate the past football games and proximity with Chadron State.

== Varsity sports ==
=== Teams ===
Men's sports

- Basketball
- Cross Country
- Football
- eSports
- Golf
- Soccer
- Track & Field

Women's sports

- Basketball
- eSports
- Cross Country
- Golf
- Track & Field
- Volleyball
