= St. Mary's High School (O'Neill, Nebraska) =

Location
- 300 North 4th Street; O'Neill, (Holt County), Nebraska 68763; United States
- 42°27′36″N 98°38′52″W

Information
- Type: Private, coeducational
- Motto: Magnificet Anima Mea Dominum (May My Soul Magnify the Lord)
- Religious affiliation: Roman Catholic
- Established: 1900
- President: Rev. Bernard Starman
- Principal: Paula Atkeson (High School) & Jennie Schneider (Grade School)
- Teaching staff: 20.3 (on an FTE basis)
- Grades: Pre-school–12
- Enrollment: 195 (including 15 in PK) (2017–18)
- Student to teacher ratio: 9.6
- Colors: Red and white
- Team name: Cardinals
- Accreditation: North Central Association of Colleges and Schools
- Website: www.stmarysoneill.org

St. Mary's School, located in O'Neill, Nebraska is a Catholic parochial school within the Archdiocese of Omaha school system in Nebraska, United States.

== Background ==
St. Mary's School was founded in 1900 by the Sisters of St. Francis of Penance and Christian Charity, who at the time were based in Buffalo, New York, but would soon move to Stella Niagara in nearby Lewiston, New York. During this period, the sisters were active in the Dakotas, Nebraska, and Colorado. In 1886 they went to Dakota Territory to begin mission work to the Lakota in what would later become South Dakota. They turned their attention to children, coming to O'Neill in 1900. In 1908 they were invited to teach at St. Agnes Academy in Alliance, Nebraska.

== Athletics ==
St. Mary's athletic teams have won a total of ten state championships. The football team has won three times, in 1957, 1984, and 2002. The volleyball team has been state champions twice, in 2013 and 2014; girls' track and field twice, in 2013 and 2014. One-time state champions have been the boys' track and field team, in 1959; the boys' basketball team, in 2012; and the girls' basketball team, in 2015.

The One Act drama performance team won the state championship in 2019.
