= List of college towns =

This is a list of college towns: towns and small cities (with a population of less than 350,000) that are socioeconomically dominated by a college or university (but not student quarters or suburbs of larger cities), sorted by continent.

Generally, to be classified as a college town, a town should exhibit one or more of the following:

- The town's cultural identity, social life, and public events are strongly shaped by the institution.
- The college or university is a major or primary employer, and its presence significantly influences the local economy.
- College or university students form a significant proportion of the town's population, often taken to be 20 per cent or more.

== Africa ==
=== South Africa ===
- Alice (University of Fort Hare)
- Empangeni (University of Zululand)
- Ga-Rankuwa (Sefako Makgatho Health Sciences University)
- George (Nelson Mandela University)
- Kimberley (Sol Plaatje University
- Mahikeng (North-West University)
- Makhanda (Rhodes University)
- Mankweng (University of Limpopo)
- Mbombela (University of Mpumalanga)
- Mthatha (Walter Sisulu University)
- Pinetown (University of KwaZulu-Natal – Edgewood Campus)
- Potchefstroom (North-West University)
- Stellenbosch (Stellenbosch University)
- Thohoyandou (University of Venda)
- Vanderbijlpark (North-West University – Vaal Triangle Campus, Vaal University of Technology)
- Westville (University of KwaZulu-Natal – Westville Campus)

=== Ghana ===
- Cape Coast (University of Cape Coast, Cape Coast Technical University)
- Ho (University of Health and Allied Sciences, Ho Technical University)
- Winneba (University of Education, Winneba)

=== Morocco ===
- El Jadida (Chouaib Doukkali University)
- Settat (Hassan I University)

== Asia ==
=== India ===
- Pilani (Birla Institute of Technology and Science)
- Saifai (Uttar Pradesh University of Medical Sciences)
- Kalapet (Pondicherry University, Puducherry Technological University)

=== Indonesia ===
- Jatinangor, Sumedang Regency (Padjadjaran University, Bandung Institute of Technology, Institute of Home Affairs Governance)
- Purwokerto (Jenderal Soedirman University, Telkom University, Purwokerto, Prof. K.H. Saifuddin Zuhri State Islamic University)

=== Malaysia ===
- Kubang Pasu, Kedah (Universiti Utara Malaysia, Polytechnic of Sultan Abdul Halim Mu'adzam Shah, Malaysia Agricultural College (Kolej Pertanian Malaysia), Industrial Training Institute (ILP), Bandar Darulaman Community College (Kolej Komuniti Bandar Darulaman), Akademi Binaan Malaysia (ABM), Institut Kemahiran Belia Negara (IKBN)).
- Kampar, Perak (The location of the Universiti Tunku Abdul Rahman as well as Tunku Abdul Rahman University of Management & Technology main campuses).
- Pagoh, Muar, Johor (Houses the Bandar Universiti Pagoh higher educational hub).
- Kota Samarahan, Sarawak (Universiti Malaysia Sarawak, Universiti Teknologi MARA Kota Samarahan Campus (2 campuses), Institute of Teacher Education (Tun Abdul Razak Campus), Kota Samarahan Industrial Training Institute (ILPKS) and AAA Zenith Services (English language service provider cum educational consultancy company)).

=== Philippines ===
- Baybay, Leyte (Visayas State University)
- Batac, Ilocos Norte (Mariano Marcos State University)
- Dumaguete (Silliman University, Negros Oriental State University, Foundation University, and St. Paul University Dumaguete)
- La Trinidad, Benguet (Benguet State University)
- Lopez, Quezon (Lopez Campus of the Polytechnic University of the Philippines, South Luzon Campus of the Philippine Normal University, Quezon Campus of the Technological University of the Philippines, Lopez Campus of Laguna State Polytechnic University)
- Los Baños, Laguna (University of the Philippines Los Baños)
- Malolos, Bulacan (Bulacan State University, La Consolacion University Philippines, Malolos campus of Centro Escolar University)
- Marawi (Mindanao State University)
- Muñoz (Central Luzon State University)
- Musuan, Maramag, Bukidnon (Central Mindanao University)

=== Taiwan ===
- Huwei Township (National Formosa University)
- Puli Township (National Chi Nan University)
- Miaoli City (National United University)
- Minxiong Township (National Chiayi University, WuFeng University and National Chung Cheng University)
- Pingtung City (National Pingtung University)
- Shoufeng Township (National Dong Hwa University, Taiwan Hospitality and Tourism University)

== Europe ==
=== Austria ===
- Hall in Tirol (UMIT – Private University for Health Sciences, Medical Informatics and Technology)
- Innsbruck (University of Innsbruck, Medical University of Innsbruck, MCI Management Center Innsbruck)
- Klagenfurt (University of Klagenfurt)
- Krems an der Donau (University for Continuing Education Krems, IMC University of Applied Sciences Krems)
- Kufstein (University of Applied Sciences Kufstein)
- Linz (Anton Bruckner Private University, Catholic Private University Linz, Johannes Kepler University Linz, University of Art and Design Linz)
- Leoben (University of Leoben)
- Salzburg (University of Salzburg, Paracelsus Medical University, Mozarteum University Salzburg, Alma Mater Europaea)

=== Belgium ===
- Ghent (Ghent University)
- Leuven (Katholieke Universiteit Leuven)
- Louvain-la-Neuve (Université catholique de Louvain)
- Mons (Université de Mons, UCLouvain FUCaM Mons)

=== Bulgaria ===
- Blagoevgrad (American University in Bulgaria, South-West University "Neofit Rilski")
- Veliko Tarnovo (Veliko Tarnovo University)

=== Croatia ===
- Osijek (Josip Juraj Strossmayer University of Osijek)
- Rijeka (University of Rijeka)

=== Czech Republic ===
- Olomouc (Palacký University)
- Zlín (Tomas Bata University in Zlín)

=== Denmark ===
- Roskilde (Roskilde University)

=== Estonia ===
- Tartu (University of Tartu, Estonian University of Life Sciences, Tartu Art College)

=== France ===
- Aix-en-Provence (Aix-Marseille University)
- Arras (Artois University)
- Chambéry (University of Savoy)
- Corte, Haute-Corse (University of Corsica Pasquale Paoli)

=== Germany ===
- Aachen (RWTH Aachen University)
- Bamberg (University of Bamberg)
- Bayreuth (University of Bayreuth)
- Clausthal-Zellerfeld (Clausthal University of Technology)
- Darmstadt (Darmstadt University of Technology)
- Eichstätt (Catholic University of Eichstätt-Ingolstadt)
- Erlangen (University of Erlangen-Nuremberg)
- Frankfurt (Oder) (Viadrina European University)
- Freiberg (Freiberg University of Mining and Technology)
- Freiburg im Breisgau (University of Freiburg)
- Garching (Technical University of Munich)
- Giessen (University of Giessen)
- Göttingen (University of Göttingen)
- Greifswald (University of Greifswald)
- Heidelberg (Heidelberg University of Jewish Studies, Pädagogische Hochschule Heidelberg, Schiller International University, SRH University of Applied Sciences Heidelberg, University of Heidelberg)
- Ilmenau (Technical University of Ilmenau)
- Jena (University of Jena)
- Kaiserslautern (RPTU University Kaiserslautern-Landau)
- Kassel (University of Kassel)
- Konstanz (Konstanz University of Applied Sciences, University of Konstanz)
- Landau (RPTU University Kaiserslautern-Landau)
- Lüneburg (Leuphana University of Lüneburg)
- Mainz (Johannes Gutenberg University of Mainz)
- Marburg (University of Marburg)
- Münster (University of Münster)
- Paderborn (University of Paderborn)
- Passau (University of Passau)
- Potsdam (University of Potsdam)
- Regensburg (University of Regensburg)
- Siegen (University of Siegen)
- Tübingen (University of Tübingen)
- Vechta (University of Vechta)
- Wittenberg (University of Halle-Wittenberg)
- Würzburg (University of Würzburg)

=== Iceland ===
- Akureyri (University of Akureyri)

=== Ireland ===
- Limerick (University of Limerick)
- Cork (University College Cork)
- Galway (National University of Ireland, Galway)
- Maynooth (Maynooth University, St Patrick's College, Maynooth)

=== Italy ===
==== Abruzzo ====
- Chieti (D'Annunzio University of Chieti–Pescara)
- L'Aquila (University of L'Aquila)
- Teramo (University of Teramo)

==== Basilicata ====
- Potenza (University of Basilicata)

==== Campania ====
- Benevento (University of Sannio)
- Caserta (Università degli Studi della Campania Luigi Vanvitelli main campus)
- Fisciano (University of Salerno main campus)

==== Emilia-Romagna ====
- Ferrara (University of Ferrara)
- Parma (University of Parma)

==== Lazio ====
- Viterbo (Tuscia University)
- Cassino (University of Cassino)

==== Lombardy ====
- Bergamo (University of Bergamo)
- Pavia (University of Pavia)

==== Marche ====
- Camerino (University of Camerino)
- Macerata (University of Macerata)
- Urbino (University of Urbino)

==== Piedmont ====
- Vercelli (University of Eastern Piedmont)

==== Puglia ====
- Lecce (University of Salento)

==== Sicily ====
- Enna (Kore University of Enna)

==== Trentino-Alto Adige/Südtirol ====
- Trento (University of Trento)

==== Tuscany ====
- Pisa (University of Pisa)
- Siena (University of Siena)

==== Umbria ====
- Perugia (University of Perugia)

==== Valle d'Aosta ====
- Aosta (Aosta Valley University)

=== Liechtenstein ===
- Vaduz (University of Liechtenstein)

=== Malta ===
- Msida (University of Malta)

=== Netherlands ===
- Delft (Delft University of Technology)
- Groningen (University of Groningen)
- Leiden (Leiden University)
- Nijmegen (Radboud University Nijmegen)
- Wageningen (Wageningen University & Research)

=== Norway ===
- Tromsø (University of Tromsø)
- Trondheim (Norwegian University of Science and Technology)

=== Poland ===
- Białystok (University of Białystok, Bialystok University of Technology, Medical University of Białystok)
- Bydgoszcz (Kazimierz Wielki University in Bydgoszcz, Bydgoszcz University of Science and Technology, Nicolaus Copernicus University Ludwik Rydygier Collegium Medicum in Bydgoszcz)
- Kielce (Jan Kochanowski University, Kielce University of Technology)
- Lublin (Maria Curie-Skłodowska University, John Paul II Catholic University of Lublin, Lublin University of Technology, Medical University of Lublin)
- Rzeszów (University of Rzeszów, Rzeszów University of Technology)
- Toruń (Nicolaus Copernicus University in Toruń, Rzeszów University of Technology)

=== Portugal ===
- Coimbra (Universidade de Coimbra)
- Évora (Universidade de Évora)
- Aveiro (Universidade de Aveiro)
- Covilhã (Universidade da Beira Interior)

=== Serbia ===
- Novi Sad (University of Novi Sad)

=== Spain ===
- Alcalá de Henares (University of Alcalá)
- Alcoy (Technical University of Valencia (Historic EPSA premises, Alcoy Campus), University of Alicante)
- Ávila (University of Salamanca (Ávila Campus), Catholic University of Ávila)
- Pamplona – (University of Navarra, Public University of Navarre)
- Salamanca (University of Salamanca)
- Santiago de Compostela (University of Santiago de Compostela)
- Segovia (IE University, University of Valladolid (Segovia Campus))

=== Sweden ===
- Gävle (University College of Gävle)
- Halmstad (Halmstad University)
- Karlstad (Karlstad University)
- Linköping (Linköping University)
- Luleå (Luleå University of Technology)
- Lund (Lund University)
- Örebro (Örebro University)
- Umeå (Umeå University)
- Uppsala (Uppsala University)
- Visby (Uppsala University – Campus Gotland)
- Växjö (Linnaeus University)

=== Switzerland ===
- Fribourg (University of Fribourg)
- Lausanne (University of Lausanne, École Polytechnique Fédérale de Lausanne)

=== Turkey ===
- Çanakkale (Çanakkale Onsekiz Mart University)
- Edirne (Trakya University)
- Muğla (Muğla Sıtkı Koçman University)

=== Ukraine ===
- Ostroh (National University Ostroh Academy)

=== United Kingdom ===
An Office for National Statistics analysis of towns and cities in England and Wales in 2021 identified that a high share of 16 to 24 year olds in the population was linked to the presence of a university, across all sizes of town and city outside of London. One of the main findings was that: "While most small towns had a relatively low share of 16- to 24-year-olds, shares were higher in the small number of small towns with a university." The average proportion of 16 to 24 year olds across England and Wales was 10.69 per cent. The presence of a university has also been linked to a high proportion of the population working in education; the top quintile for this across all built-up areas in England and Wales is 14.1 per cent and above.

The UK settlements with the highest proportion (over 30 per cent) of full-time students are St Andrews in Scotland (53 per cent), Aberystwyth and Bangor in Wales (both 42 per cent), and Durham and Canterbury in England (both 35 per cent). With the exception of Canterbury, these towns are dominated by a single institution that was established as a university or university college before the end of the 19th century. Canterbury has three universities – one established in the 1960s and two that became universities in the 21st century.

The Telegraph listed the best eight university towns in Britain in 2025 as Aberystwyth, Bristol, Cambridge, Durham, Glasgow, Newcastle, Norwich and Oxford.

==== England ====
Towns and cities with a university and a high proportion of 16 to 24 year olds (over 75 per cent above the average across England and Wales) in 2019 are listed below, (Note: Catterick Garrison, a military town, has 22 per cent of its population in this age range but no university) along with the 2021 population of their built up area (BUA), the 2020/21 enrolment in their universities, (Note: This may include students enroled at the universities but not living in the BUA) the proportion of people in the BUA employed in the education sector and the proportion of people in the BUA who identified in the census as full-time students (England average 7.7 per cent).

The BUA with the highest proportion of full-time students was Durham, with 35 per cent of the economically active population, closely followed by the multi-university city of Canterbury. The largest BUA to have over 20 per cent of its population composed of full-time students was Nottingham, at 24 per cent, with a population of almost 300,000, while the largest BUA containing only a single major institution was Exeter, with a population of over 125,000 and 21 per cent full-time students. Oxford, Cambridge and Durham all had over 20 per cent of their population employed in education.

Town name	Universities	16 to 25	Population	Enrolment	Ratio	Employment in education	Full-time students
Penryn	Falmouth University	36%	11,195	6,000 (Note: Estimated size of the Penryn Campus)	54%	13.8%	29.8%
Penryn	University of Exeter	36%	11,195	6,000	54%	13.8%	29.8%
Canterbury	University of Kent	33%	55,090	18,585 (Note: includes students at Canterbury and Medway campuses)	79%	19.4%	34.7%
Canterbury	Canterbury Christ Church University	33%	55,090	16,355	79%	19.4%	34.7%
Canterbury	University for the Creative Arts	33%	55,090	8,420 (Note: includes students at Canterbury, Epsom and Farnham campuses)	79%	19.4%	34.7%
Durham	Durham University	32%	50,510	20,645	41%	21.1%	35.2%
Egham, Surrey	Royal Holloway, University of London	28%	28,000	12,295	44%	12.1%	29.9%
Loughborough	Loughborough University	27%	64,860	18,335	28%	17.1%	28.6%
Hatfield, Hertfordshire	University of Hertfordshire	25%	41,560	30,100	72%	8.3%	28.0%
Bath	University of Bath	23%	94,080	18,555	30%	14.9%	22.7%
Bath	Bath Spa University	23%	94,080	9,235	30%	14.9%	22.7%
Oxford	Oxford Brookes University	22%	170,805	17,810	26%	23.2%	25.6%
Oxford	University of Oxford	22%	170,805	27,150	26%	23.2%	25.6%
Nottingham	Nottingham Trent University	22%	299,790	38,995 (Note: includes students at Nottingham, Clifton, Brackenhurst, Mansfield and London campuses)	25%	10.7%	23.9%
Nottingham	University of Nottingham	22%	299,790	35,785	25%	10.7%	23.9%
Falmouth	Falmouth University	21%	24,070	6,170 (Note: includes students at Falmouth and Penryn campuses)	26%	11.7%	19.8%
Cambridge	Anglia Ruskin University	21%	152,740	32,180 (Note: includes students at Cambridge, Chelmsford and Peterborough, campuses)	36%	21.1%	24.6%
Cambridge	University of Cambridge	21%	152,740	22,155	36%	21.1%	24.6%
Guildford	University of Surrey	20%	77,880	16,565	21%	12.5%	20.9%
Lincoln	University of Lincoln	20%	104,555	17,565	19%	9.6%	18.3%
Lincoln	Bishop Grosseteste University	20%	104,555	2,465	19%	9.6%	18.3%
Exeter	University of Exeter	20%	126,175	30,250 (Note: includes students at Exeter, Truro and Penryn campuses)	24%	13.6%	20.6%
Newcastle upon Tyne	Newcastle University	20%	286,445	27,775	16%	11.0%	19.5%
Newcastle upon Tyne	Northumbria University Newcastle	20%	286,445	31,860 (Note: includes students at Newcastle and London campuses)	16%	11.0%	19.5%
Lancaster	University of Lancaster	19%	52,655	17,470	51%	17.9%	19.6%
Lancaster	University of Cumbria	19%	52,655	9,280 (Note: includes students at Carlisle, Lancaster, London and Ambleside campuses)	51%	17.9%	19.6%

==== Northern Ireland ====
Town name	Universities	16 to 25 (2021)	Population (2021)	Enrolment (2021)	Ratio	Employment in education	Full-time students
Coleraine	Ulster University at Coleraine	11%	24,483	4,250	17%	9.9%	7.9%

==== Scotland ====
Proportions of full-time students from the 2022 Census for Scotland by census settlement

- St Andrews (University of St Andrews) - 52.8%
- Stirling (University of Stirling) – 15.6%
- Dundee (University of Dundee, Abertay University) – 12.6%

==== Wales ====
Towns and cities with a university and a high proportion of 16 to 24 year olds in 2019:

Town name	Universities	16 to 25	Population	Enrolment	Ratio	Employment in education	Full-time students
Aberystwyth	Aberystwyth University	38%	14,640	8,040	55%	18.1%	42.1%
Bangor	Bangor University	33%	16,990	9,705	57%	13.2%	41.5%

== North America ==
=== Canada ===
- Antigonish, Nova Scotia (Saint Francis Xavier University)
- Church Point, Nova Scotia (Université Sainte-Anne)
- Guelph, Ontario (University of Guelph)
- Kingston, Ontario (Queen's University at Kingston, Royal Military College of Canada)
- Peterborough, Ontario (Trent University)
- Sackville, New Brunswick (Mount Allison University)
- Waterloo, Ontario (University of Waterloo, Wilfrid Laurier University)
- Wolfville, Nova Scotia (Acadia University)
- Sherbrooke, Québec (Université de Sherbrooke, Bishop's University)

=== United States ===
Blake Gumprecht wrote the first major study of US college towns in 2008. For this work, he identified 305 cities where enrolment in 4-year colleges was more than 20% of the population and which met other criteria, including having an urban-area population of less than 350,000 and being physically separated from any larger city. He specifically mentioned Austin, Texas, which is dominated by the state government, and Tempe, Arizona, which is part of a larger urban area, as examples of places that have some of the characteristics of college towns but that he does not include. The study covered 60 towns, including three cities located in urban areas that were noted as not meeting the criteria: Cambridge, Massachusetts, Berkeley, California and Claremont, California. The full list of college towns that met the criteria in 2000 was published online as supplemental material.

Gumprecht's college towns had a median population (in 2000) of 11,998, a median enrolment of 6,153, a median enrolment to population ratio of 48%, a median fraction of the population in the 18–24 age range of 31%, and a median fraction of employment in education of 21%. Most colleges in college towns were established in the 19th century, with a median establishment date of 1883. There are 12 (4% of the total) from post-1945, with the most recent being Saratoga Springs, where the first college in the town was founded or moved there in 1971.

==== Alabama ====
- Auburn (Auburn University)
- Fairfield (Miles College)
- Homewood (Samford University)
- Jacksonville (Jacksonville State University)
- Livingston (University of West Alabama)
- Montevallo (University of Montevallo)
- Troy (Troy University)
- Tuscaloosa (University of Alabama)
- Tuskegee (Tuskegee University)

==== Alaska ====
- Fairbanks (University of Alaska, Fairbanks)

==== Arizona ====
- Flagstaff (Northern Arizona University)
- Tempe (Arizona State University)

==== Arkansas ====
- Arkadelphia (Henderson State University)
- Conway (University of Central Arkansas)
- Fayetteville (University of Arkansas)
- Jonesboro (Arkansas State University)
- Magnolia (Southern Arkansas University)
- Monticello (University of Arkansas at Monticello)
- Russellville (Arkansas Tech University)
- Searcy (Harding University)

==== California ====
- Angwin (Pacific Union College)
- Arcata (Humboldt State University)
- Azusa (Azusa Pacific University)
- Berkeley (University of California, Berkeley)
- Chico (California State University, Chico)
- Davis (University of California, Davis)
- Irvine (University of California, Irvine)
- La Verne (University of La Verne)
- Loma Linda (Loma Linda University)
- Long Beach (California State University Long Beach)
- Malibu (Pepperdine University)
- Moraga (St. Mary's College of California)
- Orange (Chapman University)
- Pomona (Cal Poly Pomona)
- Redlands (University of Redlands)
- Rocklin (Sierra College, Jessup University)
- San Luis Obispo (California Polytechnic State University)
- Santa Barbara (University of California, Santa Barbara)
- Santa Cruz (University of California, Santa Cruz)
- Seaside (California State University, Monterey Bay)
- Turlock (California State University, Stanislaus)

==== Colorado ====
- Alamosa (Adams State University)
- Boulder (University of Colorado at Boulder)
- Durango (Fort Lewis College)
- Fort Collins (Colorado State University)
- Golden (Colorado School of Mines)
- Grand Junction (Colorado Mesa University)
- Greeley (University of Northern Colorado)
- Gunnison (Western Colorado University)
- Lakewood (Colorado Christian University)
- Pueblo (Colorado State University–Pueblo)

==== Connecticut ====
- Bridgeport (University of Bridgeport)
- Danbury (Western Connecticut State University)
- East Hartford (Goodwin College)
- Fairfield (Fairfield University, Sacred Heart University)
- Farmington (UConn Health)
- Hamden (Quinnipiac University)
- Middletown (Wesleyan University)
- New Britain (Central Connecticut State University)
- New Haven (Yale University)
- North Haven (Quinnipiac University graduate campus)
- Southington (New England Baptist College)
- Stamford (University of Connecticut, University of Bridgeport and Sacred Heart University branch campuses)
- Storrs (University of Connecticut)
- Willimantic (Eastern Connecticut State University)
- West Hartford (University of Hartford, University of Saint Joseph, University of Connecticut Greater Hartford campus)
- West Haven (University of New Haven)

==== Delaware ====
- Newark (University of Delaware)

==== Florida ====
- Boca Raton (Florida Atlantic University)
- Coral Gables (University of Miami)
- DeLand (Stetson University)
- Gainesville (University of Florida)
- Panama City (Gulf Coast State College)
- St. Augustine (Flagler College)
- St. Leo (St. Leo University)
- Tallahassee (Florida State University, Florida A&M University, Tallahassee State College)

==== Georgia ====
- Athens (University of Georgia)
- Brunswick (College of Coastal Georgia)
- Carrollton (University of West Georgia)
- Dahlonega (University of North Georgia)
- Demorest (Piedmont University)
- Fort Valley (Fort Valley State University)
- Milledgeville (Georgia College & State University, Georgia Military College)
- Mount Vernon (Brewton–Parker Christian University)
- Oxford (Oxford College)
- Savannah (Armstrong Atlantic State University, Savannah State University, Savannah College of Art and Design, Savannah Law School)
- Statesboro (Georgia Southern University, East Georgia State College)
- Waleska (Reinhardt University)

==== Hawaii ====
- Laie (Brigham Young University-Hawai'i)

==== Idaho ====
- Caldwell (College of Idaho)
- Lewiston (Lewis-Clark State College)
- Moscow (University of Idaho)
- Nampa (Northwest Nazarene University)
- Pocatello (Idaho State University)
- Rexburg (Brigham Young University–Idaho)

==== Illinois ====
- Aurora (Aurora University)
- Bloomington (Illinois Wesleyan University)
- Bourbonnais (Olivet Nazarene University)
- Carbondale (Southern Illinois University Carbondale)
- Champaign–Urbana (University of Illinois)
- Charleston (Eastern Illinois University)
- Deerfield (Trinity International University)
- DeKalb (Northern Illinois University)
- Downers Grove (Midwestern University)
- East Peoria (Illinois Central College)
- Edwardsville (Southern Illinois University Edwardsville)
- Elgin (Judson University)
- Elmhurst (Elmhurst University)
- Joliet (University of St. Francis)
- Lebanon (McKendree University)
- Macomb (Western Illinois University)
- Naperville (North Central College, Northern Illinois University satellite campus, DePaul University satellite campus, College of DuPage Naperville Regional Center, Governors State University satellite campus, Northwestern College Naperville campus, University of Illinois Urbana-Champaign Business & Industry Services campus)
- Peoria (Bradley University)
- River Forest (Dominican University, Concordia University)
- Rockford (Rockford University)
- Springfield (University of Illinois Springfield)
- University Park (Governors State University)

==== Indiana ====
- Angola (Trine University)
- Bloomington (Indiana University Bloomington)
- Greencastle (DePauw University)
- Hanover (Hanover College)
- Marion (Indiana Wesleyan University)
- Muncie (Ball State University)
- Notre Dame (University of Notre Dame, Saint Mary's College, Holy Cross College)
- Oakland City (Oakland City University)
- South Bend (University of Notre Dame)
- Terre Haute (Indiana State University, Rose-Hulman Institute of Technology)
- Upland (Taylor University)
- West Lafayette (Purdue University)

==== Iowa ====
- Ames (Iowa State University)
- Cedar Falls (University of Northern Iowa)
- Decorah (Luther College)
- Fayette (Upper Iowa University)
- Grinnell (Grinnell College)
- Indianola (Simpson College)
- Iowa City (University of Iowa)
- Lamoni (Graceland University)
- Mount Vernon (Cornell College)
- Orange City (Northwestern College)
- Oskaloosa (William Penn University)
- Sioux Center (Dordt University)
- Storm Lake (Buena Vista University)

==== Kansas ====
- Baldwin City (Baker University)
- Emporia (Emporia State University)
- Hays (Fort Hays State University)
- Lawrence (University of Kansas, Haskell Indian Nations University)
- Manhattan (Kansas State University)
- Pittsburg (Pittsburg State University)
- Topeka (Washburn University)

==== Kentucky ====
- Barbourville (Union Commonwealth University)
- Berea (Berea College)
- Bowling Green (Western Kentucky University)
- Campbellsville (Campbellsville University)
- Columbia (Lindsey Wilson University)
- Crestview Hills (Thomas More University)
- Danville (Centre College, Bluegrass Community and Technical College, Eastern Kentucky University, Midway University, American National University)
- Frankfort (Kentucky State University)
- Georgetown (Georgetown College)
- Grayson (Kentucky Christian University)
- Highland Heights (Northern Kentucky University)
- Midway (Midway University)
- Morehead (Morehead State University)
- Murray (Murray State University)
- Pikeville (University of Pikeville)
- Richmond (Eastern Kentucky University)
- Williamsburg (University of the Cumberlands)
- Wilmore (Asbury University, Asbury Theological Seminary)

==== Louisiana ====
- Grambling (Grambling State University)
- Hammond (Southeastern Louisiana University)
- Monroe (University of Louisiana at Monroe)
- Natchitoches (Northwestern State University)
- Ruston (Louisiana Tech University)
- Thibodaux (Nicholls State University)

==== Maine ====
- Augusta (University of Maine at Augusta)
- Bangor (University of Maine)
- Bar Harbor (College of the Atlantic)
- Biddeford (University of New England)
- Brunswick (Bowdoin College)
- Farmington (University of Maine at Farmington)
- Fort Kent (University of Maine at Fort Kent)
- Gorham (University of Southern Maine)
- Lewiston (Bates College)
- Machias (University of Maine at Machias)
- Orono (University of Maine)
- Portland (Maine College of Art, University of Maine School of Law, University of New England (formerly Westbrook College), University of Southern Maine)
- Presque Isle (University of Maine at Presque Isle)
- Waterville (Thomas College, Colby College)

==== Maryland ====
- Annapolis (United States Naval Academy)
- Chestertown (Washington College)
- College Park (University of Maryland, College Park)
- Cumberland (Allegany College of Maryland)
- Emmitsburg (Mount St. Mary's University)
- Frostburg (Frostburg State University)
- Princess Anne (University of Maryland Eastern Shore)
- Salisbury (Salisbury University)
- Silver Spring (Montgomery College Takoma Park/Silver Spring campus, Howard University School of Continuing Education)
- Takoma Park (Washington Adventist University, Montgomery College (Takoma Park/Silver Spring Campus))
- Westminster (McDaniel College)

==== Massachusetts ====
- Amherst (Amherst College, Hampshire College, University of Massachusetts Amherst)
- Bridgewater (Bridgewater State University)
- Cambridge (Harvard University, Massachusetts Institute of Technology)
- Chestnut Hill (parts) and Boston’s Cleveland Circle neighborhood (Boston College)
- Dartmouth (University of Massachusetts Dartmouth)
- Fitchburg (Fitchburg State University)
- Lowell (University of Massachusetts Lowell)
- Medford (Tufts University)
- North Adams (Massachusetts College of Liberal Arts)
- North Andover (Merrimack College)
- Northampton (Smith College)
- South Hadley (Mount Holyoke College)
- Waltham (Bentley University, Brandeis University)
- Wellesley (Babson College, Wellesley College)
- Westfield (Westfield State University)
- Williamstown (Williams College)

==== Michigan ====
- Adrian (Adrian College, Siena Heights University)
- Albion (Albion College)
- Allendale (Grand Valley State University)
- Alma (Alma College)
- Ann Arbor (Concordia University, University of Michigan)
- Berrien Springs (Andrews University)
- Big Rapids (Ferris State University)
- Dearborn (University of Michigan–Dearborn, Henry Ford College, Concordia University Dearborn Center, Central Michigan University)
- East Lansing (Michigan State University)
- Flint (Kettering University, University of Michigan-Flint)
- Genoa Township (Cleary University main campus)
- Hillsdale (Hillsdale College)
- Holland (Hope College)
- Houghton (Michigan Technological University)
- Kalamazoo (Western Michigan University, Kalamazoo College)
- Lansing (Western Michigan University Cooley Law School)
- Marquette (Northern Michigan University)
- Midland (Northwood University)
- Mount Pleasant (Central Michigan University)
- Olivet (University of Olivet)
- Saginaw (Saginaw Valley State University)
- Sault Ste. Marie (Lake Superior State University)
- Spring Arbor (Spring Arbor University)
- Ypsilanti (Eastern Michigan University)
- Warren (Davenport University satellite campus, Warren Center for Central Michigan University, Wayne State University's Advanced Technology Education Center)

==== Minnesota ====
- Bemidji (Bemidji State University)
- Crookston (University of Minnesota Crookston)
- Duluth (University of Minnesota Duluth, Lake Superior College, College of St. Scholastica, University of Wisconsin–Superior, Duluth Business University)
- Faribault (South Central College)
- Mankato (Minnesota State University, Mankato)
- Marshall (Southwest Minnesota State University)
- Moorhead (Minnesota State University, Moorhead, Concordia College)
- Morris (University of Minnesota Morris)
- Northfield (Carleton College, St. Olaf College)
- North Mankato (South Central College)
- Pine City (Pine Technical and Community College)
- St. Cloud (St. Cloud State University, College of St. Scholastica)
- St. Joseph (College of Saint Benedict)
- Saint Paul (Saint Catherine University, Concordia University, Hamline University, Macalester College, University of St. Thomas, Metropolitan State University, Saint Paul College, Mitchell Hamline School of Law)
- St. Peter (Gustavus Adolphus College)
- Winona (Winona State University, St. Mary's University of Minnesota)

==== Mississippi ====
- Blue Mountain (Blue Mountain Christian University)
- Cleveland (Delta State University)
- Clinton (Mississippi Christian University)
- Columbus (Mississippi University for Women)
- Hattiesburg (University of Southern Mississippi, William Carey University, Pearl River Community College)
- Holly Springs (Rust College)
- Itta Bena (Mississippi Valley State University)
- Jackson (Jackson State University, Millsaps College, Belhaven University, Mississippi College School of Law)
- Laurel (Southeastern Baptist College)
- Oxford (University of Mississippi)
- Southaven (University of Mississippi, Northwest Mississippi Community College)
- Starkville (Mississippi State University)
- Tougaloo (Tougaloo College)

==== Missouri ====
- Bolivar (Southwest Baptist University)
- Cape Girardeau (Southeast Missouri State University)
- Columbia (University of Missouri, Stephens College, Columbia College)
- Fayette (Central Methodist University)
- Fulton (Westminster College, William Woods University)
- Kirksville (Truman State University, A. T. Still University)
- Maryville (Northwest Missouri State University)
- Rolla (Missouri University of Science and Technology)
- Warrensburg (University of Central Missouri)

==== Montana ====
- Billings (Montana State University Billings, Rocky Mountain College, Yellowstone Baptist College)
- Bozeman (Montana State University)
- Butte (Montana Tech)
- Dillon (University of Montana Western)
- Great Falls (University of Great Falls, Great Falls College Montana State University)
- Havre (Montana State University–Northern)
- Helena (Carroll College, Helena College University of Montana)
- Missoula (University of Montana)

==== Nebraska ====
- Chadron (Chadron State College)
- Crete (Doane College)
- Hastings (Hastings College)
- Lincoln (University of Nebraska–Lincoln)
- Kearney (University of Nebraska at Kearney)
- Peru (Peru State College)
- Seward (Concordia University)
- Wayne (Wayne State College)
- York (York University)

==== Nevada ====
- Henderson (Nevada State College, National University, Roseman University of Health Sciences, Touro University Nevada)
- Incline Village (University of Nevada, Reno, Sierra Nevada campus)
- Reno (University of Nevada)

==== New Hampshire ====
- Durham (University of New Hampshire)
- Hanover (Dartmouth College)
- Henniker (New England College)
- Keene (Keene State College, Antioch University New England)
- New London (Colby–Sawyer College)
- Pinardville (Saint Anselm College)
- Plymouth (Plymouth State University)

==== New Jersey ====
- Ewing (The College of New Jersey, Rider University)
- Jersey City (Kean Jersey City, Saint Peter's University)
- Glassboro (Rowan University)
- Madison (Drew University, Fairleigh Dickinson University, Saint Elizabeth University)
- Montclair (Montclair State University)
- New Brunswick (Rutgers-New Brunswick, Middlesex College)
- Princeton (Princeton University, Westminster Choir College)
- Ramsey (Ramapo College, Eastwick College)
- South Orange (Seton Hall University)
- Union (Kean University)
- West Long Branch (Monmouth University)

==== New Mexico ====
- Las Cruces (New Mexico State University)
- Las Vegas (New Mexico Highlands University)
- Portales (Eastern New Mexico University)
- Silver City (Western New Mexico University)

==== New York ====
- Alfred (Alfred University, Alfred State College)
- Aurora (Wells College)
- Binghamton (Binghamton University)
- Brockport (SUNY Brockport)
- Canton (St. Lawrence University, SUNY Canton)
- Clinton (Hamilton College)
- Cobleskill (SUNY Cobleskill)
- Cortland (State University of New York at Cortland)
- Delhi (SUNY Delhi)
- Fredonia (SUNY Fredonia)
- Geneseo (SUNY Geneseo)
- Geneva (Hobart and William Smith Colleges)
- Hamilton (Colgate University)
- Houghton (Houghton College)
- Ithaca (Cornell University, Ithaca College)
- Newburgh (Mount Saint Mary College)
- New Paltz (SUNY New Paltz)
- New Rochelle (Iona University)
- Oneonta (SUNY Oneonta, Hartwick College)
- Oswego (SUNY Oswego)
- Plattsburgh (SUNY Plattsburgh)
- Potsdam (SUNY Potsdam, Clarkson University)
- Poughkeepsie (Vassar College, Marist University)
- Saratoga Springs (Skidmore College)
- Schenectady (Union College, Schenectady County Community College)
- Seneca Falls (New York Chiropractic College)
- Stony Brook (Stony Brook University)
- Syracuse (Syracuse University, SUNY Environmental Science and Forestry, Le Moyne College, SUNY Upstate Medical University)
- Tivoli (Bard College)
- Troy (Rensselaer Polytechnic Institute, Russell Sage College, Hudson Valley Community College)
- Utica (SUNY Polytechnic Institute, Utica University, Mohawk Valley Community College)
- Valhalla (New York Medical College)
- West Point (United States Military Academy)

==== North Carolina ====
- Asheville (Shaw University, Lenoir-Rhyne University, University of North Carolina at Asheville, South College – Asheville)
- Banner Elk (Lees–McRae College)
- Belmont (Belmont Abbey College)
- Boiling Springs (Gardner-Webb University)
- Boone (Appalachian State University)
- Brevard (Brevard College)
- Buies Creek (Campbell University)
- Chapel Hill (University of North Carolina at Chapel Hill)
- Cullowhee (Western Carolina University)
- Davidson (Davidson College)
- Durham (Duke University, North Carolina Central University)
- Elizabeth City (Mid-Atlantic Christian University)
- Elon (Elon University)
- Fayetteville (Methodist University)
- Greensboro (University of North Carolina at Greensboro, Greensboro College, Guilford College, North Carolina A & T State University, Bennett College, Elon University School of Law)
- Greenville (East Carolina University)
- High Point (High Point University)
- Laurinburg (St. Andrews University)
- Mars Hill (Mars Hill University)
- Misenheimer (Pfeiffer University)
- Montreat (Montreat College)
- Mount Olive (University of Mount Olive)
- Murfreesboro (Chowan University)
- Pembroke (University of North Carolina at Pembroke)
- Raleigh (North Carolina State University, Campbell University-Norman Adrian Wiggins School of Law, Meredith College, William Peace University, Shaw University, St. Augustine's University)
- Rocky Mount (North Carolina Wesleyan University)
- Salisbury (Catawba College, Livingstone College)
- Wilmington (University of North Carolina at Wilmington)
- Wilson (Barton College)
- Wingate (Wingate University)
- Winston-Salem (Wake Forest University, University of North Carolina School of the Arts, Salem College, Winston-Salem State University)

==== North Dakota ====
- Bismarck (University of Mary)
- Dickinson (Dickinson State University)
- Fargo (North Dakota State University)
- Grand Forks (University of North Dakota)
- Jamestown (University of Jamestown)
- Mayville (Mayville State University)
- Minot (Minot State University)
- Valley City (Valley City State University)

==== Ohio ====
- Ada (Ohio Northern University)
- Akron (University of Akron)
- Alliance (University of Mount Union)
- Ashland (Ashland University)
- Athens (Ohio University)
- Berea (Baldwin Wallace University)
- Bluffton (Bluffton University)
- Bowling Green (Bowling Green State University)
- Cedarville (Cedarville University)
- Dayton (University of Dayton, Wright State University Boonshoft School of Medicine)
- Delaware (Ohio Wesleyan University)
- Fairborn (Wright State University)
- Findlay (University of Findlay)
- Gambier (Kenyon College)
- Granville (Denison University)
- Hiram (Hiram College)
- Kent (Kent State University)
- New Concord (Muskingum University)
- Oberlin (Oberlin College)
- Oxford (Miami University)
- Perrysburg Township (Owens Community College)
- Rio Grande (University of Rio Grande)
- Springfield (Wittenberg University)
- Steubenville (Franciscan University of Steubenville)
- Tiffin (Tiffin University, Heidelberg University)
- Toledo (University of Toledo, University of Toledo College of Medicine and Life Sciences, Davis University, Mercy College of Ohio)
- Westerville (Otterbein University)
- Wilberforce (Wilberforce University, Central State University)
- Wooster (College of Wooster)
- Yellow Springs (Antioch College, Antioch University Midwest)
- Youngstown (Youngstown State University)

==== Oklahoma ====
- Ada (East Central University)
- Alva (Northwestern Oklahoma State University)
- Bethany (Southern Nazarene University)
- Claremore (Rogers State University)
- Durant (Southeastern Oklahoma State University)
- Edmond (University of Central Oklahoma, Oklahoma Christian University)
- Goodwell (Oklahoma Panhandle State University)
- Langston (Langston University)
- Lawton (Cameron University)
- Midwest City (Rose State College)
- Norman (University of Oklahoma)
- Stillwater (Oklahoma State University)
- Tahlequah (Northeastern State University)
- Weatherford (Southwestern Oklahoma State University)

==== Oregon ====
- Ashland (Southern Oregon University)
- Corvallis (Oregon State University)
- Eugene (University of Oregon, Lane Community College, Northwest Christian University)
- Forest Grove (Pacific University)
- Klamath Falls (Klamath Community College, Oregon Institute of Technology)
- La Grande (Eastern Oregon University)
- Monmouth (Western Oregon University)
- Newberg (George Fox University)

==== Pennsylvania ====
- Annville (Lebanon Valley College)
- Bloomsburg (Commonwealth University-Bloomsburg)
- Bradford (University of Pittsburgh at Bradford)
- California (PennWest California)
- Carlisle (Dickinson College, Penn State Dickinson School of Law)
- Clarion (PennWest Clarion)
- Cresson (Mount Aloysius College)
- East Stroudsburg (East Stroudsburg University of Pennsylvania)
- Edinboro (PennWest Edinboro)
- Gettysburg (Gettysburg College)
- Grantham (Messiah University)
- Greensburg (Seton Hill University, University of Pittsburgh at Greensburg, Lake Erie College of Osteopathic Medicine branch campus)
- Grove City (Grove City College)
- Indiana (Indiana University of Pennsylvania)
- Kutztown (Kutztown University of Pennsylvania)
- Lewisburg (Bucknell University)
- Lock Haven (Commonwealth University-Lock Haven)
- Loretto (St. Francis University)
- Mansfield (Commonwealth University-Mansfield)
- Meadville (Allegheny College)
- Mont Alto (Penn State Mont Alto)
- Millersville (Millersville University of Pennsylvania)
- New Wilmington (Westminster College)
- Selinsgrove (Susquehanna University)
- Shippensburg (Shippensburg University of Pennsylvania)
- Slippery Rock (Slippery Rock University of Pennsylvania)
- State College (Pennsylvania State University)
- Swarthmore (Swarthmore College)
- Waynesburg (Waynesburg University)
- West Chester (West Chester University)
- Williamsport (Lycoming College, Pennsylvania College of Technology)

==== Rhode Island ====
- Bristol (Roger Williams University)
- Kingston (University of Rhode Island)
- Newport (Salve Regina University)
- Smithfield (Bryant University)
- Warwick (Community College of Rhode Island)

==== South Carolina ====
- Beaufort (University of South Carolina Beaufort)
- Central (Southern Wesleyan University)
- Clemson (Clemson University)
- Clinton (Presbyterian College)
- Columbia (University of South Carolina)
- Conway (Coastal Carolina University)
- Due West (Erskine College)
- Florence (Francis Marion University)
- Greenville (Bob Jones University, Furman University, North Greenville University, University of South Carolina School of Medicine)
- Greenwood (Lander University)
- North Charleston (Charleston Southern University, Trident Technical College – Main Campus)
- Orangeburg (South Carolina State University, Claflin University)
- Rock Hill (Winthrop University)
- Spartanburg (Wofford College, Converse University, University of South Carolina Upstate, Spartanburg Methodist College, Edward Via College of Osteopathic Medicine, Spartanburg Community College, Virginia College, Sherman College of Chiropractic)

==== South Dakota ====
- Aberdeen (Northern State University)
- Brookings (South Dakota State University)
- Madison (Dakota State University)
- Rapid City (South Dakota School of Mines & Technology)
- Sioux Falls (University of Sioux Falls, Augustana University, Sioux Falls Seminary, Kilian Community College, Southeast Technical Institute, National American University, South Dakota School for the Deaf, Globe University/Minnesota School of Business, University of South Dakota's Sanford School of Medicine (Sioux Falls campus), Stewart School, South Dakota Public Universities and Research Center (USDSU))
- Spearfish (Black Hills State University)
- Vermillion (University of South Dakota)

==== Tennessee ====
- Chattanooga (University of Tennessee at Chattanooga)
- Clarksville (Austin Peay State University, Miller-Motte Technical College, Nashville State Community College, Daymar Institute, North Tennessee Bible Institute)
- Collegedale (Southern Adventist University)
- Cookeville (Tennessee Technological University)
- Harrogate (Lincoln Memorial University)
- Henderson (Freed-Hardeman University)
- Jefferson (Carson-Newman University)
- Johnson City (East Tennessee State University)
- Knoxville (University of Tennessee, Duncan School of Law (Lincoln Memorial Univ.))
- Lebanon (Cumberland University)
- Martin (University of Tennessee at Martin)
- Murfreesboro (Middle Tennessee State University)
- Sewanee (Sewanee: the University of the South)

==== Texas ====
- Abilene (Abilene Christian University, Hardin-Simmons University, McMurry University)
- Alpine (Sul Ross State University)
- Amarillo (Wayland Baptist University branch campus, Texas Tech University Health Sciences Center at Amarillo School of Pharmacy, Texas Tech University at Amarillo, West Texas A&M University satellite campus)
- Arlington (University of Texas at Arlington)
- Beaumont (Lamar University)
- Belton (University of Mary Hardin-Baylor)
- Big Spring (Howard College)
- Brownsville (The University of Texas Rio Grande Valley)
- Brenham (Blinn College)
- Bryan (Texas A&M University, Blinn College – Bryan Campus, Texas A&M Health Science Center)
- Canyon (West Texas A&M University)
- College Station (Texas A&M University)
- Commerce (Texas A&M University–Commerce)
- Corpus Christi (Texas A&M University-Corpus Christi, Del Mar College, Saint Leo University-Corpus Christi)
- Denton (University of North Texas, Texas Woman's University, Texas A&M University Baylor College of Dentistry)
- Edinburg (University of Texas Rio Grande Valley)
- El Paso (University of Texas at El Paso)
- Fort Worth (Texas Christian University, Texas Wesleyan University, Texas A&M School of Law)
- Galveston (Texas A&M University at Galveston)
- Georgetown (Southwestern University)
- Garland (Amberton University)
- Huntsville (Sam Houston State University)
- Irving (University of Dallas, North Lake College)
- Keene (Southwestern Adventist University)
- Killeen (Central Texas College, Texas A&M University-Central Texas)
- Kingsville (Texas A&M University–Kingsville)
- Laredo (Texas A&M International University, University of Texas Health Science Center at San Antonio – Laredo campus)
- Lubbock (Texas Tech University, Lubbock Christian University)
- Marshall (Wiley University, East Texas Baptist University, Panola College, Texas State Technical College (Marshall)
- McAllen (University of Texas Rio Grande Valley)
- Mesquite (Texas A&M University–Commerce Mesquite Metroplex Center, Columbia College-Mesquite Campus)
- Nacogdoches (Stephen F. Austin State University)
- Odessa (The University of Texas Permian Basin)
- Pasadena (University of Houston–Clear Lake)
- Pearland (University of Houston–Clear Lake satellite campus)
- Plainview (Wayland Baptist University)
- Prairie View (Prairie View A&M University)
- Richardson (University of Texas at Dallas main campus)
- San Angelo (Angelo State University)
- San Marcos (Texas State University)
- Stephenville (Tarleton State University)
- Texarkana (Texas A&M University–Texarkana)
- Tyler (The University of Texas at Tyler)
- University Park (Southern Methodist University)
- Waco (Baylor University)
- Wichita Falls (Midwestern State University)

==== Utah ====
- Cedar City (Southern Utah University)
- Ephraim (Snow College)
- Logan (Utah State University)
- Ogden (Weber State University)
- Orem (Utah Valley University)
- Provo (Brigham Young University)
- St. George (Utah Tech University)

==== Vermont ====
- Bennington (Bennington College)
- Burlington (University of Vermont, Champlain College)
- Castleton (Vermont State University–Castleton)
- Colchester (Saint Michael's College)
- Craftsbury (Sterling College)
- Johnson (Vermont State University Johnson)
- Lyndonville (Vermont State University Lyndon)
- Middlebury (Middlebury College)
- Northfield (Norwich University)
- Randolph Center (Vermont State University Randolph)

==== Virginia ====
- Alexandria (The George Washington University, Virginia Commonwealth University branch campus)
- Amherst (Sweet Briar College)
- Arlington (Marymount University, George Mason University)
- Blacksburg (Virginia Tech)
- Bridgewater (Bridgewater College)
- Charlottesville (University of Virginia)
- Farmville (Longwood University, Hampden–Sydney College)
- Fredericksburg (University of Mary Washington)
- Hampton (Hampton University, Bryant and Stratton College)
- Harrisonburg (James Madison University, Eastern Mennonite University)
- Lexington (Washington and Lee University, Virginia Military Institute)
- Lynchburg (Lynchburg College, Randolph College, Liberty University, Virginia University of Lynchburg, Central Virginia Community College)
- Newport News (Christopher Newport University)
- Norfolk (Old Dominion University, Norfolk State University)
- Portsmouth (Old Dominion University)
- Radford (Radford University)
- Roanoke (Hollins University, Roanoke College, Jefferson College of Health Sciences, Virginia Western Community College)
- Staunton (Mary Baldwin University)
- Williamsburg (College of William & Mary)
- Wise (University of Virginia's College at Wise)

==== Washington ====
- Bellingham (Western Washington University)
- Cheney (Eastern Washington University)
- College Place (Walla Walla University)
- Ellensburg (Central Washington University)
- Lacey (St. Martin's University)
- Parkland (Pacific Lutheran University)
- Pullman (Washington State University)
- Richland (Washington State University Tri-Cities)
- Walla Walla (Whitman College)

==== West Virginia ====
- Athens (Concord University)
- Beckley (West Virginia University Institute of Technology)
- Buckhannon (West Virginia Wesleyan College)
- Elkins (Davis & Elkins College)
- Fairmont (Fairmont State University)
- Glenville (Glenville State University)
- Huntington (Marshall University)
- Institute (West Virginia State University)
- Lewisburg (West Virginia School of Osteopathic Medicine)
- Montgomery (West Virginia University Institute of Technology)
- Morgantown (West Virginia University)
- Shepherdstown (Shepherd University)
- West Liberty (West Liberty University)

==== Wisconsin ====
- Appleton (Lawrence University)
- Eau Claire (University of Wisconsin–Eau Claire)
- Green Bay (University of Wisconsin-Green Bay)
- Kenosha (University of Wisconsin-Parkside, Carthage College, Kenosha campus of Gateway Technical College, National-Louis University, Herzing University)
- La Crosse (University of Wisconsin–La Crosse, Western Technical College, Viterbo University)
- Madison (University of Wisconsin–Madison)
- Menomonie (University of Wisconsin–Stout)
- Oshkosh (University of Wisconsin–Oshkosh)
- Platteville (University of Wisconsin–Platteville)
- River Falls (University of Wisconsin–River Falls)
- Stevens Point (University of Wisconsin–Stevens Point)
- Waukesha (Carroll University)
- Whitewater (University of Wisconsin–Whitewater)

==== Wyoming ====
- Laramie (University of Wyoming)

==== Puerto Rico ====
- Mayagüez, Puerto Rico (UPR Mayagüez, Pontifical Catholic University, Antillean Adventist University,)

== Oceania ==
=== Australia ===
==== New South Wales ====
- Armidale (University of New England)
- Wollongong (University of Wollongong)

==== Northern Territory ====
- Darwin (Charles Darwin University)

==== Queensland ====
- Bundaberg (Central Queensland University)
- Mackay (Central Queensland University)
- Rockhampton (Central Queensland University)
- Sippy Downs (University of the Sunshine Coast)
- Springfield (University of Southern Queensland)
- Toowoomba (University of Southern Queensland)
- Townsville (James Cook University)

==== South Australia ====
- Mount Gambier (University of South Australia, Southern Cross University and Flinders University)

==== Victoria ====
- Ballarat (Federation University Australia)
- Bendigo (La Trobe University – Bendigo campus)
- Churchill (Federation University Australia)
- Geelong (Deakin University)
- Warrnambool (Deakin University)
- Wodonga (La Trobe University)

==== Western Australia ====
- Albany (University of Western Australia)
- Broome (University of Notre Dame Australia)
- Bunbury (Edith Cowan University)
- Fremantle (University of Notre Dame Australia)
- Joondalup (Edith Cowan University)

=== New Zealand ===
- Dunedin (University of Otago, Otago Polytechnic)
- Lincoln (Lincoln University)

== South America ==
=== Argentina ===
- Chamical (Federal University of La Rioja, Chamical)

=== Brazil ===
- Santa Maria, Rio Grande do Sul (Federal University of Santa Maria, Fransciscan University Center, Lutheran University of Brazil)
- São João del-Rei, Minas Gerais (Federal University of São João del-Rei)
- Viçosa, Minas Gerais (Federal University of Viçosa)

=== Colombia ===
- Pamplona (Universidad de Pamplona)

=== Venezuela ===
- Mérida (University of the Andes, Mérida)
