= College town =

Community dominated by its university population

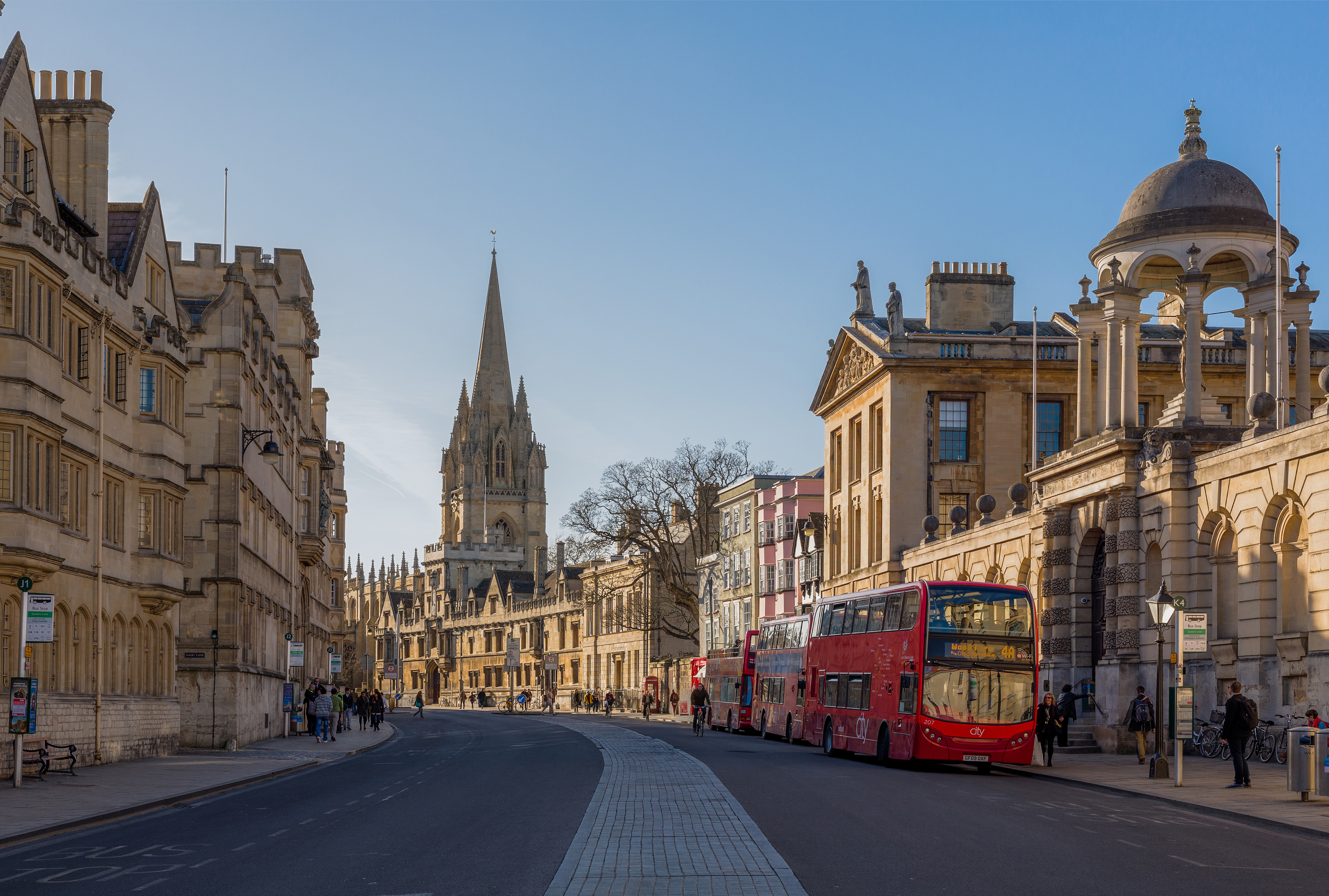
High Street in Oxford, England, a prototypical example of a university town. There is no central campus; rather, university buildings are scattered around the city between shops, such as those at centre right of the picture.

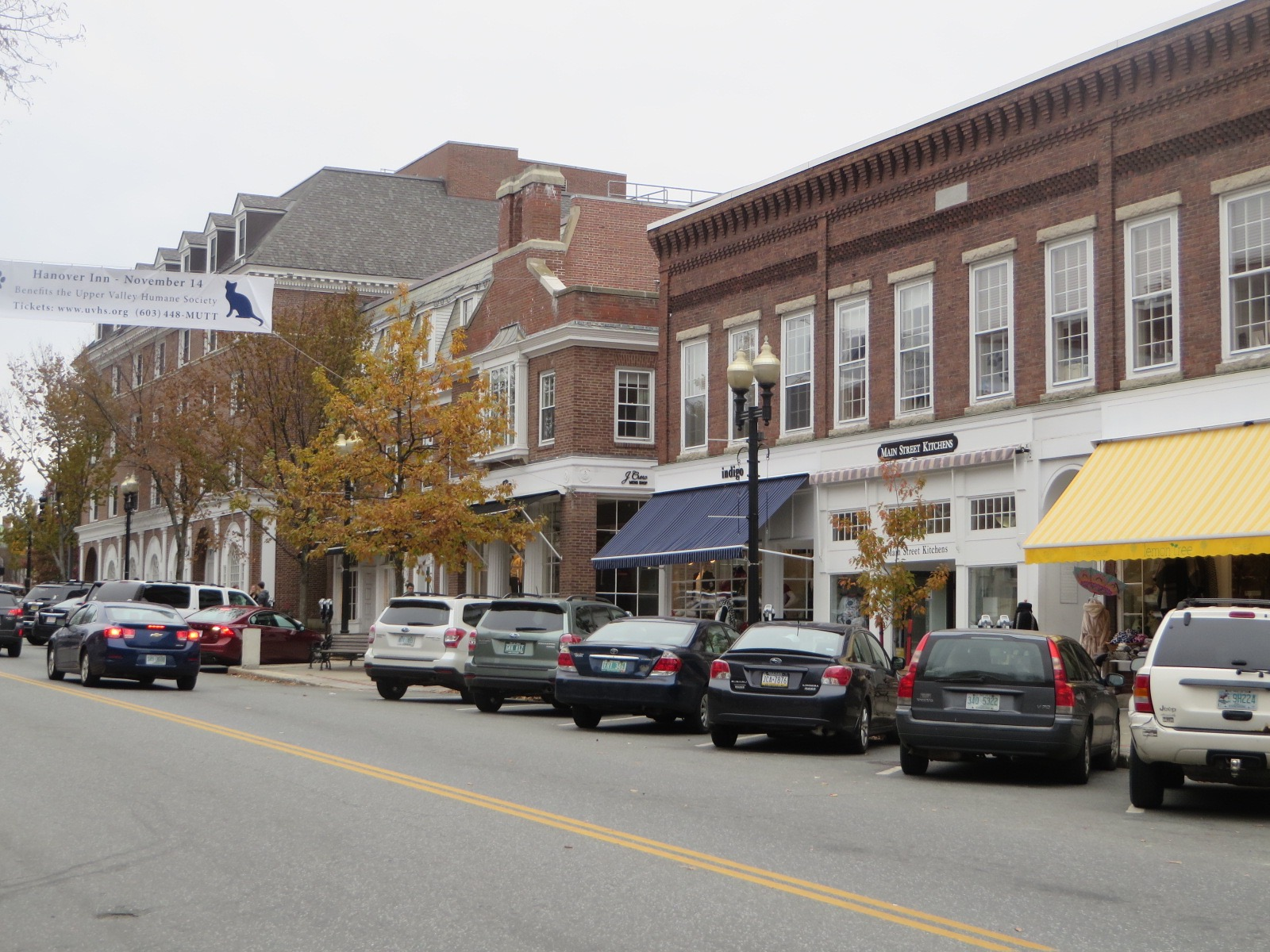
Main Street in Hanover, New Hampshire, home to the Ivy League university Dartmouth College

A college town or university town is a town or city whose character is dominated by a college or university and their associated culture, often characterised by the student population making up 20 percent of the population of the community, but not including communities that are parts of larger urban areas (often termed student quarters). The university may be large, or there may be several smaller institutions such as liberal arts colleges clustered, or the residential population may be small, but college towns in all cases are so dubbed because the presence of the educational institution(s) pervades economic and social life. Many local residents may be employed by the university—which may be the largest employer in the community—many businesses cater primarily to the university, and the student population may outnumber the local population.

== Description ==
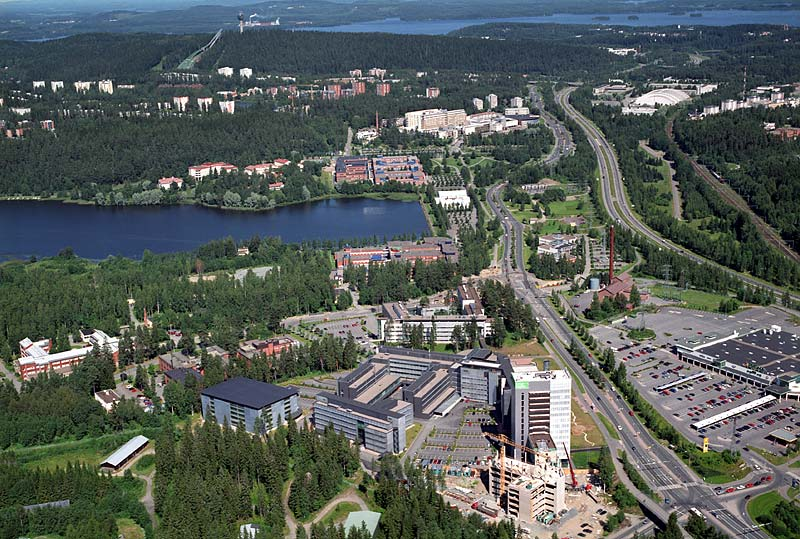
Kuopio, North Savo, home to the University of Eastern Finland and Savonia University of Applied Sciences

In Europe, a university town is generally characterised by having an old university. The economy of the city is closely related with the university activity and highly supported by the entire university structure, which may include university hospitals and clinics, printing houses, libraries, laboratories, business incubators, student rooms, dining halls, students' unions, student societies, and academic festivities. Moreover, the history of the city is often intertwined with that of the university. Many European university towns have not merely been important places of science and education, but also centres of political, cultural and social influence throughout the centuries. In university towns such as Oxford, Cambridge, St Andrews and Durham, the town centre is dominated both physically and functionally by the university, with the result that the town has become identified with the university. While in many historical university towns, the town has grown up around the university, Durham is an example of a university town where the university has 'colonised' the town centre.

In the United States, many of the land-grant universities are located in college towns because of their historical mandate to provide agricultural education and research. In these towns, there is frequently a strong tradition of "school pride" in the community with many of the town's residents working for (and loyal to) the college or university, wearing the school colours, attending university sporting events (such as American college football games, which draw crowds of 100,000 or more). Examples of these land-grant college towns include Athens, Georgia (University of Georgia) and State College, Pennsylvania (Penn State).

== Development ==
In most of Europe, medieval universities grew or were founded in major urban areas rather than in college towns, although there were exceptions such as Siena in Italy, Tübingen in Germany and Cambridge in England. In the US, by contrast, the development of universities preceded urban growth and founders of colleges often chose (after the models of Oxford and Cambridge) to site their institutions away from cities, although, as at Cambridge, Massachusetts, home of Harvard University, the metropolitan areas have sometimes since expanded to take in the college town. A second driver of the growth of college towns in the US was that towns that wished to develop economically competed to attract colleges with donations of cash and land.

As a result of this history, the university buildings in classical European university towns are located on multiple sites in the city centre, while the university buildings in American college towns are concentrated on a campus distinct from the city itself. Thus, the student residential area in historic European university towns such as Oxford, Cambridge and Durham is around the city centre, while in US college towns such as Ithaca, New York, it is outside the city centre and near the campus.

Two examples of college towns in the US and the UK that have been the subject of academic studies are Ithaca, New York, and Durham, England. These are cities of similar sizes, with the Durham built up area and the Ithaca urban area both having populations between 50,000 and 60,000 in 2021. They both also have major universities founded in the 19th century, with student populations of over 20,000.

Ithaca is a relatively recent foundation, with settlement of the city beginning with a "military tract" designated in 1790 for veterans of the American Revolutionary War. In contrast, Durham is an ancient cathedral city, established in the 10th century. The university was founded by the cathedral in 1832 and is the third oldest in England. Unlike Cornell University in Ithaca, which developed on a campus east of the city centre there, Durham University was mainly based in the city centre, around Palace Green and the Bailey, until the mid 20th century, when it expanded into the Elvet area of the city and the hilly area south of this.

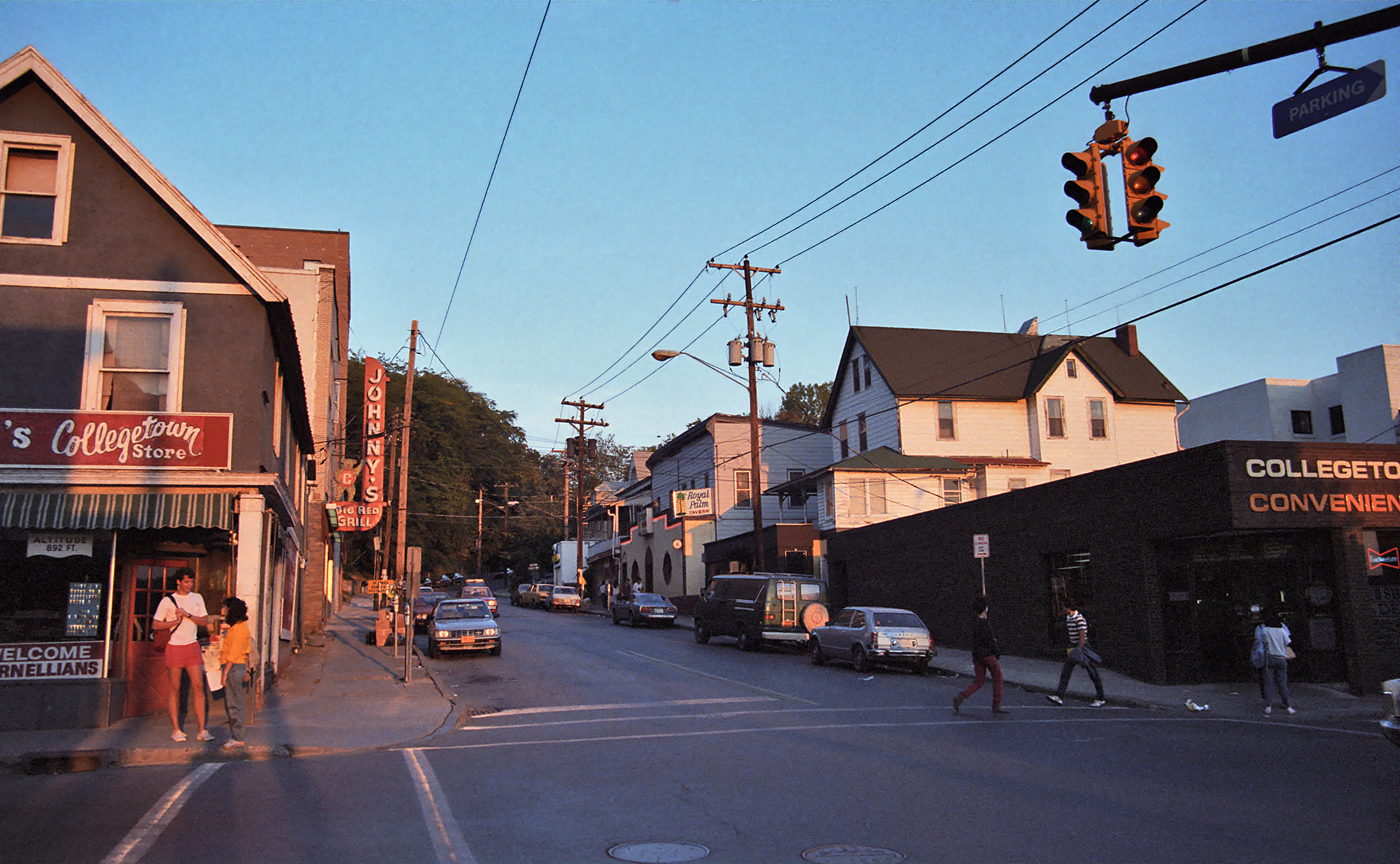
Collegetown, Ithaca, in the mid-1980s

In Ithaca, the two main areas for student residence are Collegetown, to the southwest of the Cornell University campus, and the Greek housing district, to the west of the campus. These were undeveloped when the university opened in 1868. Collegetown developed, similarly to other student rental districts in the US, in response to student demand, with cheap rooming houses and private dormitories being built in the late 19th and early 20th centuries. Collegetown developed its own central business district, catering to the needs of students. After World War 2, in common with other US universities, Cornell's student population increased dramatically, nearly doubling between 1940 and 1965. This drove the further development of Collegetown, with rooming houses becoming apartments and the conversion into student accommodation of many family homes that had been built in the areas furthest from campus. The area also became run down, with a number of proposals for renewal put forward including, in 1969, compete demolition. However, it was not until Cornell invested in Collegetown projects in the 1980s that there was any significant change, with large, student accommodation blocks described as "a cross between dormitories and apartments" replacing the old houses in the area close to campus. However, the areas further away from campus remained large houses subdivided into apartments, and continued increase in the student population pushed the edge of the student rental area west towards the centre of Ithaca and east into Bryant Park.

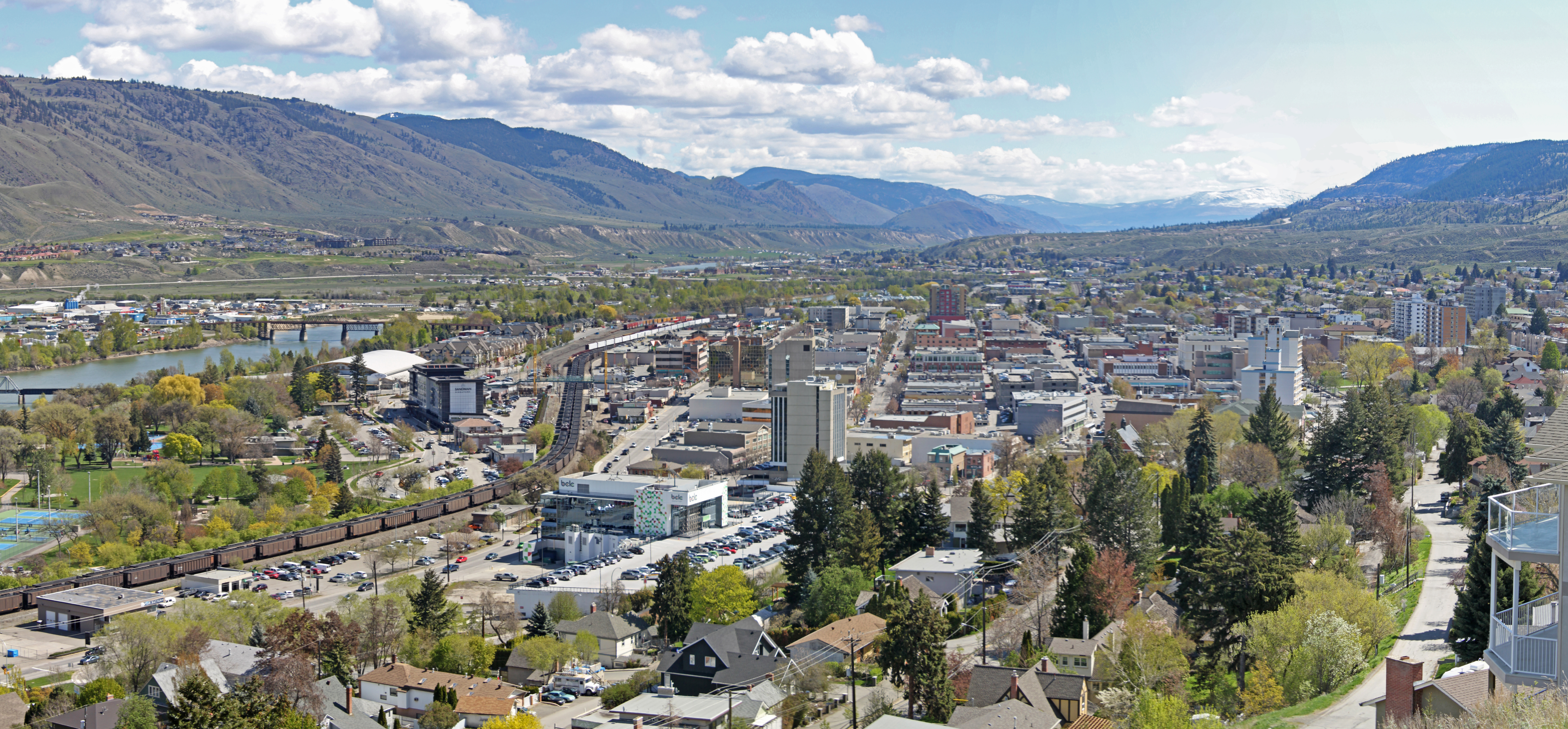
Thompson Rivers University is a major employer in the college town of Kamloops, British Columbia.

Until the 1980s almost all students at Durham University lived in colleges rather than accommodation in town, but expansion of the university after this outstripped the growth in college accommodation, leading to many students renting privately in surrounding areas, particularly Elvet and the Viaduct area around the railway viaduct. Unlike Ithaca, where Collegetown was built to accommodate the student population, these areas were already long-established residential districts – Elvet was an ancient borough chartered in the late 12th or early 13th century, with much of the housing converted to student use being former council houses, while the Viaduct area developed during the 19th century as Victorian terraced houses.

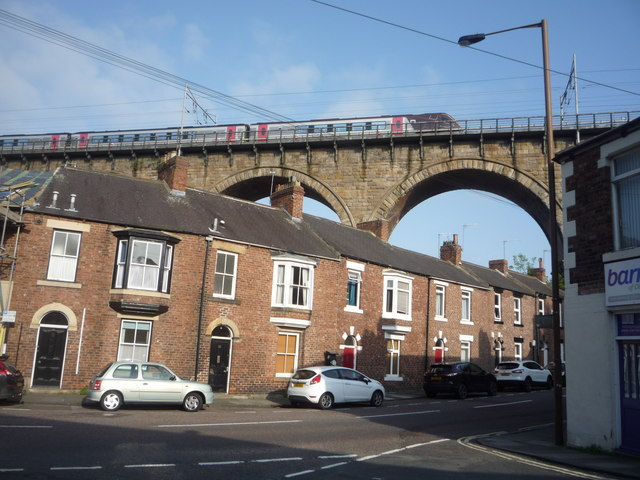
Terraced houses beneath the railway viaduct in Durham, now largely occupied by student renters

From the 1990s onwards, these were increasingly occupied by students, with over 1,800 houses being converted to student rents over a 25 to 30-year period to 2022 and some streets reaching 100 per cent student occupancy. Durham County Council introduced a student housing policy in 2014 and from 2016 required planning permission to convert single family houses to houses in multiple occupation (HMOs), but this was widely regarded as being "too little too late". The council also encouraged the development of purpose built student accommodation (PBSA) in the city to relieve pressure on the housing market, with the first private PBSA, built by Unite Students opening in Elvet in 2012. Retail premises in the city centre were also converted to private halls of residence. However, demand for HMOs continued to rise, leading to growth in other areas of the city, with Gilesgate in particular seeing large rises in student rents between 2014 and 2022.

=== Studentification ===
The process of neighbourhoods becoming dominated by high concentrations of students, typically near universities, is known as studentification, a term coined by Darren Smith in 2002. Studentification has mainly been identified in the context of student quarters within larger cities, with the term having been originally coined with reference to Leeds in England. However, Durham provides an example of studentification in a smaller college town.

The phenomenon of studentification causes rapid social, cultural, economic, and physical changes, often transforming family housing into Houses of Multiple Occupancy (HMOs) and shifting local services toward student-focused amenities. It has been a feature of both university towns and university quarters in larger cities in the late 20th and early 21st centuries as university enrolment grew faster than the capacity of universities to expand on-campus housing. It may be perceived as a form of gentrification but can also brings benefits to towns, with student spending boosting local economies across multiple sectors and the student population allowing towns and cities to project a cosmopolitan image in their marketing.

== Town–gown relations ==
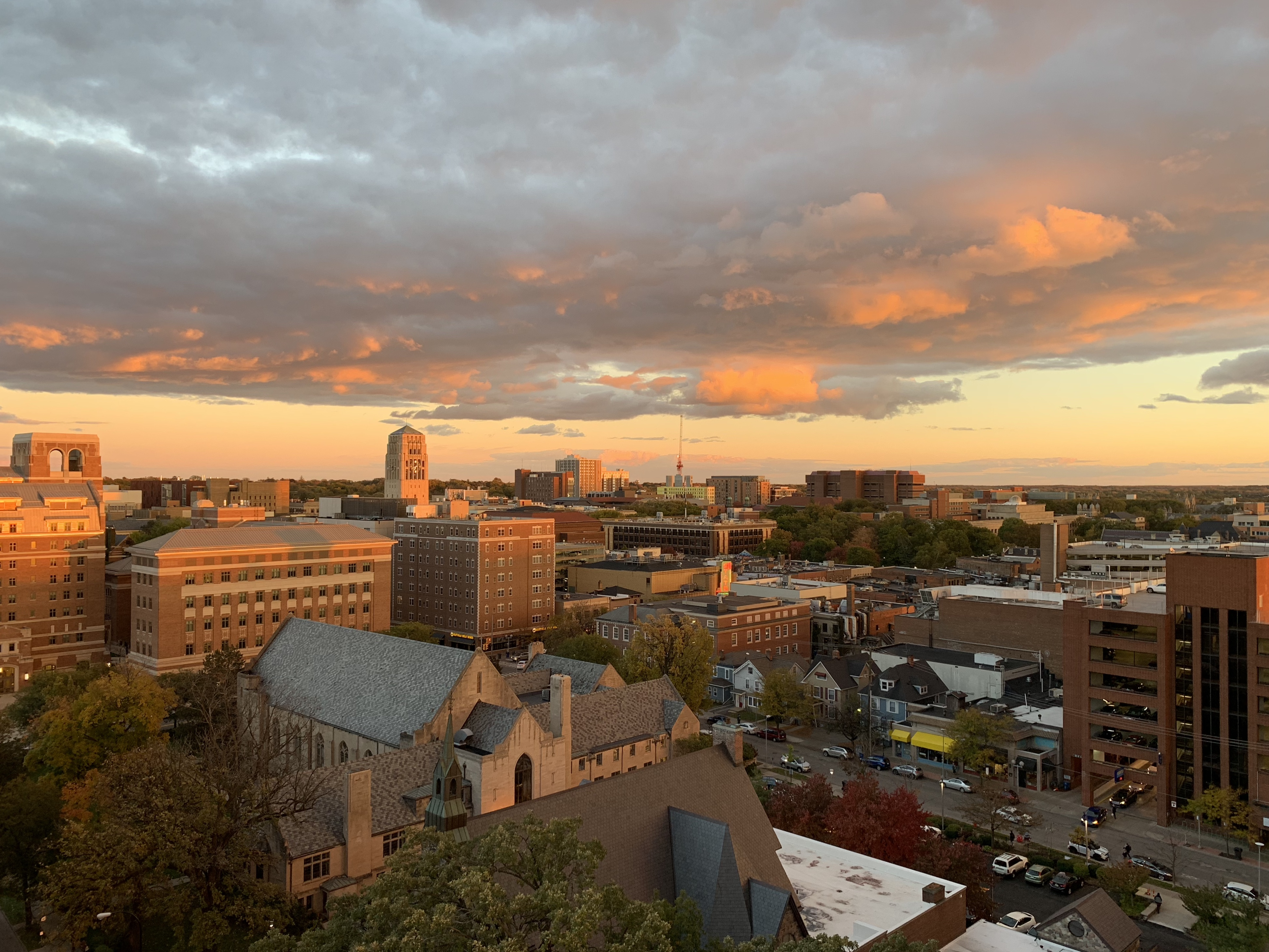
Ann Arbor, Michigan, home to the University of Michigan

As in the case of a company town, the large and transient student population may come into conflict with other townspeople. Students may come from outside the area and be from different socio-economic classes than local residents, increasing tensions. The different demographics of the student population can lead to school closures, and the conversion of family homes into houses in multiple occupation can reduce the availability of affordable housing. Economically, the high spending power of the university and of its students in aggregate may inflate the cost of living above that of the region. However, small college towns can also lead to more close-knit academic communities as staff interact frequently outside of work, leading to better work–life balance.

== See also ==
- List of college towns
- Student quarter
- Town and gown
- Company town
- Campus
