= South Dakota Public Universities and Research Center =

Cooperative higher education system in Sioux Falls, South Dakota

Coordinates: 43°34′09″N 96°46′48″W

South Dakota Public Universities and Research Center, also known as University Center, was a cooperative higher education delivery system in Sioux Falls, South Dakota. Six universities offered classes at this site: University of South Dakota, Dakota State University, South Dakota State University, Black Hills State University, South Dakota School of Mines and Technology, and Northern State University.

In 2006, the South Dakota Board of Regents received authorization to obtain a large area in Sioux Falls to construct a new campus for its Sioux Falls offerings.

The South Dakota Board of Regents changed the name of the University Center to The Community College for Sioux Falls in April 2019.

In June 2022, the Board of Regents formally ended the multi-university cooperative, named the University of South Dakota as the primary provider of academic offerings, and renamed the campus the University of South Dakota (USD) — Sioux Falls.
