= Sioux Falls, South Dakota =

Sioux Falls
- City
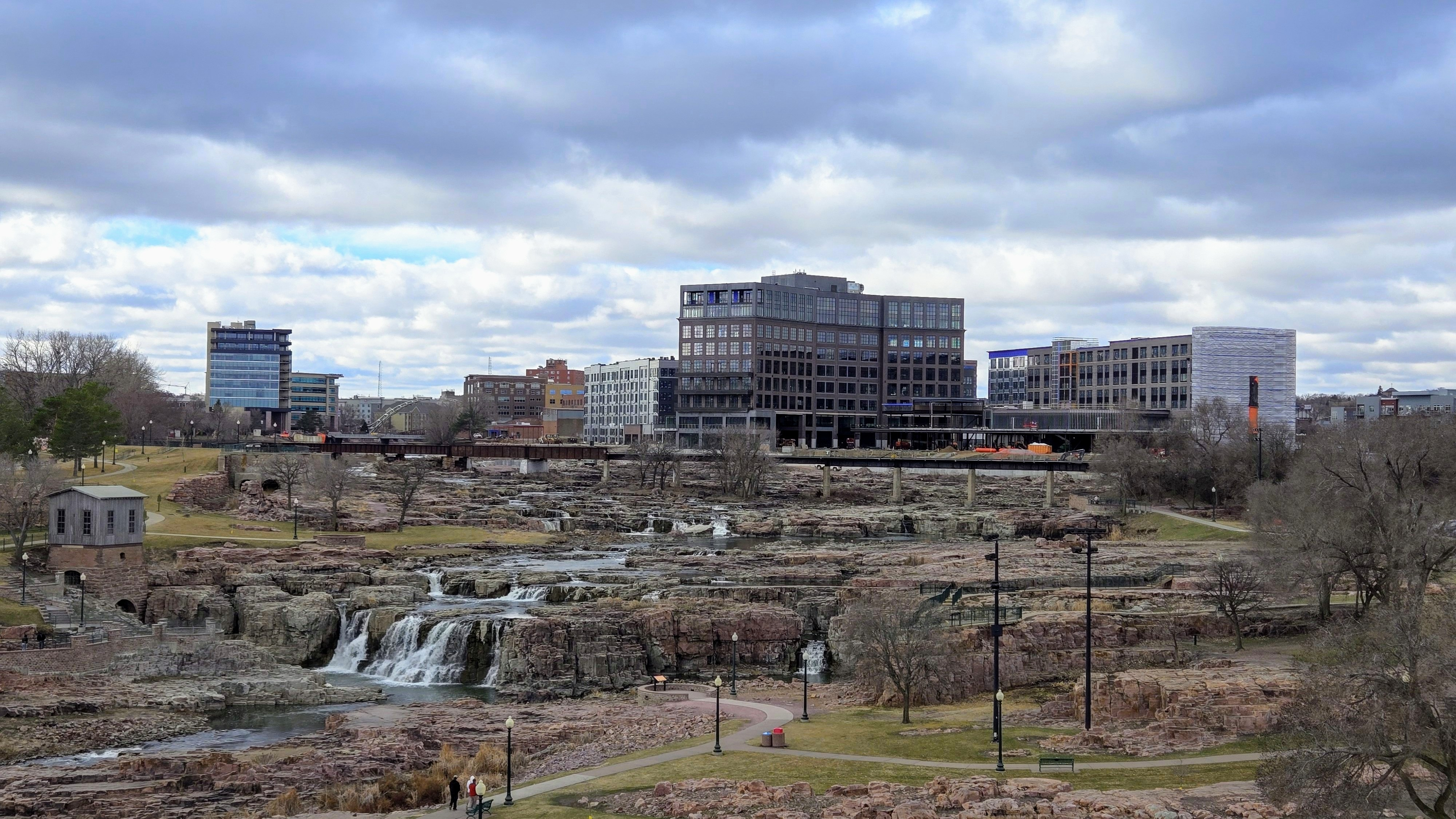
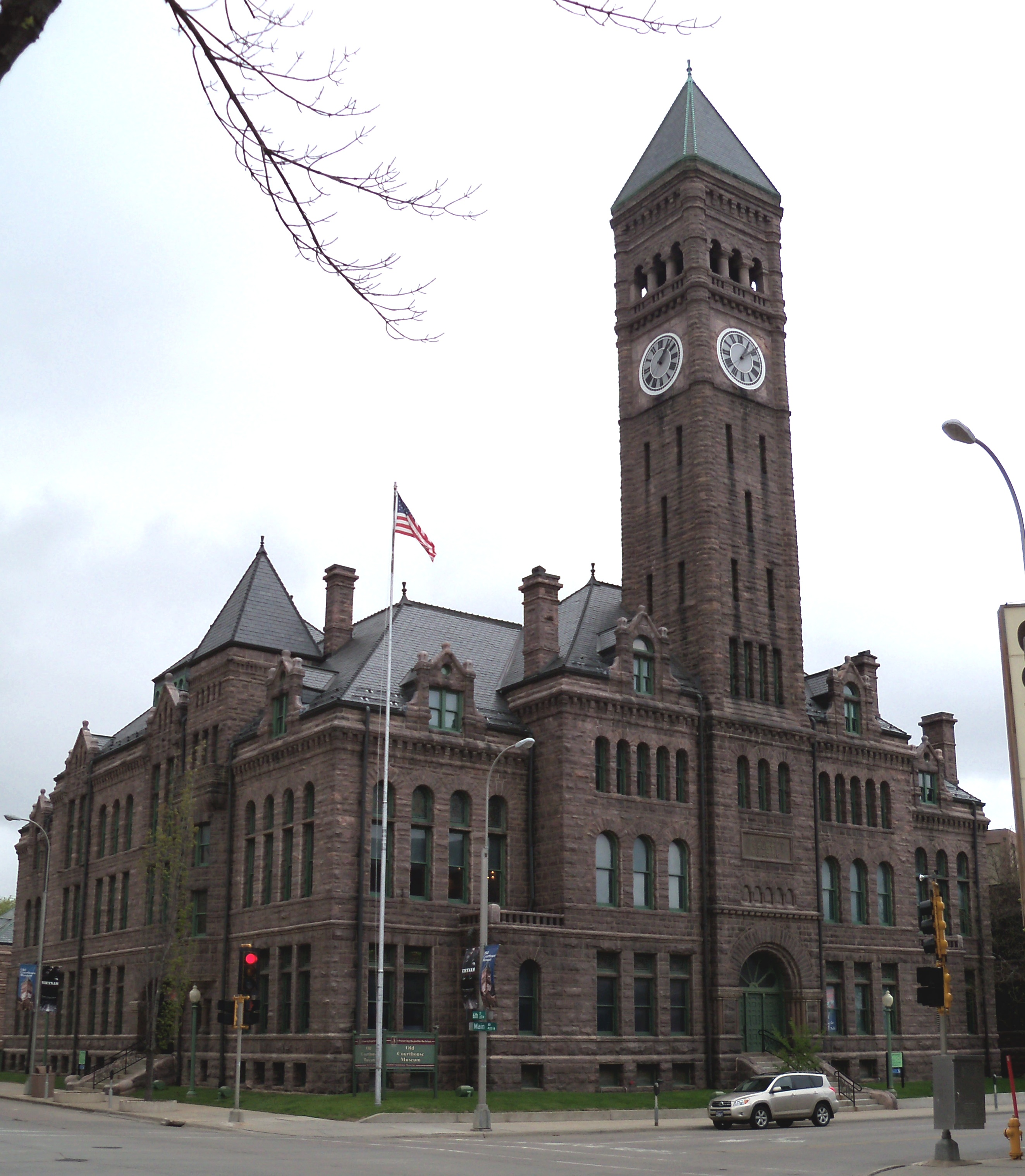
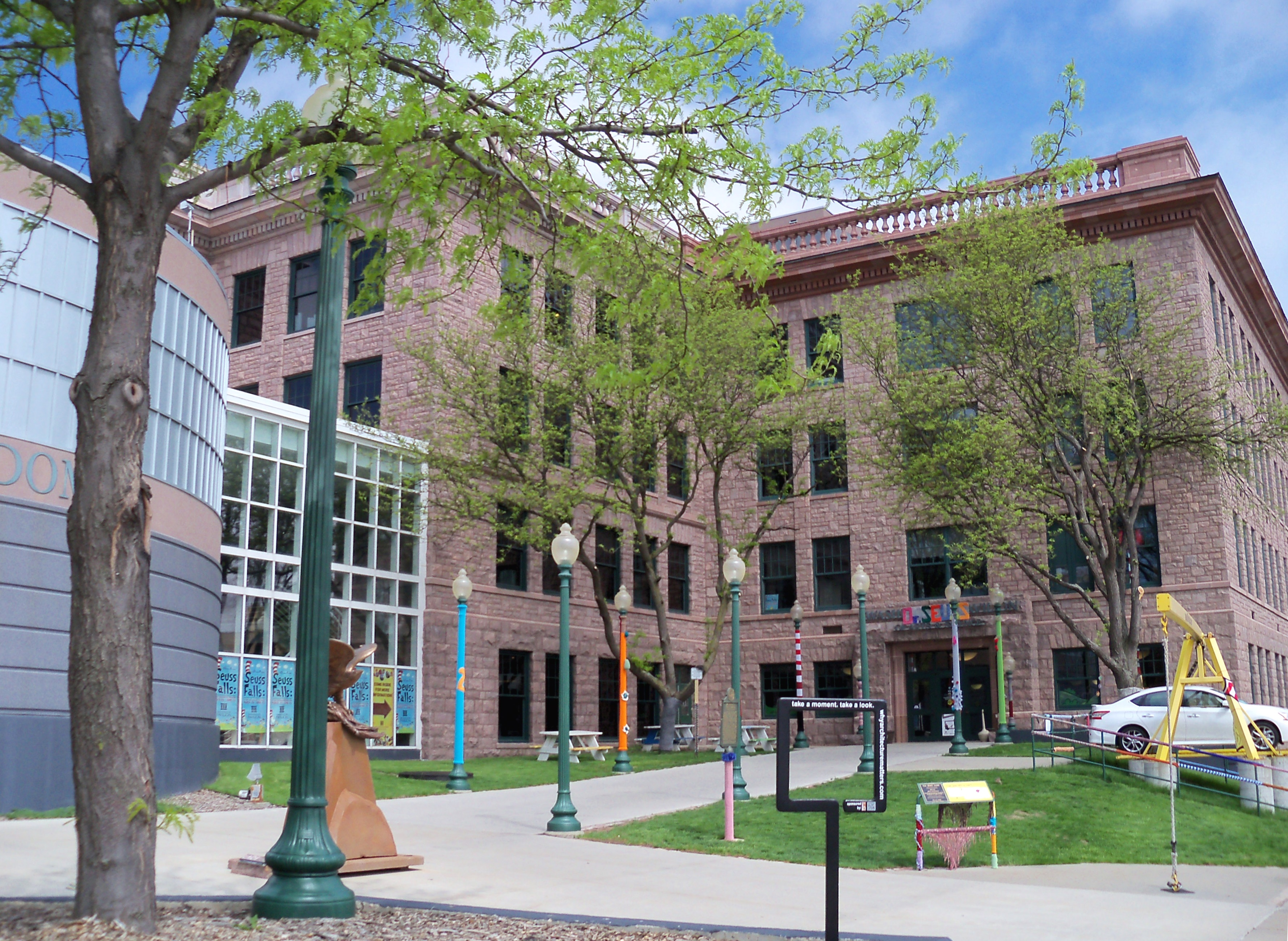
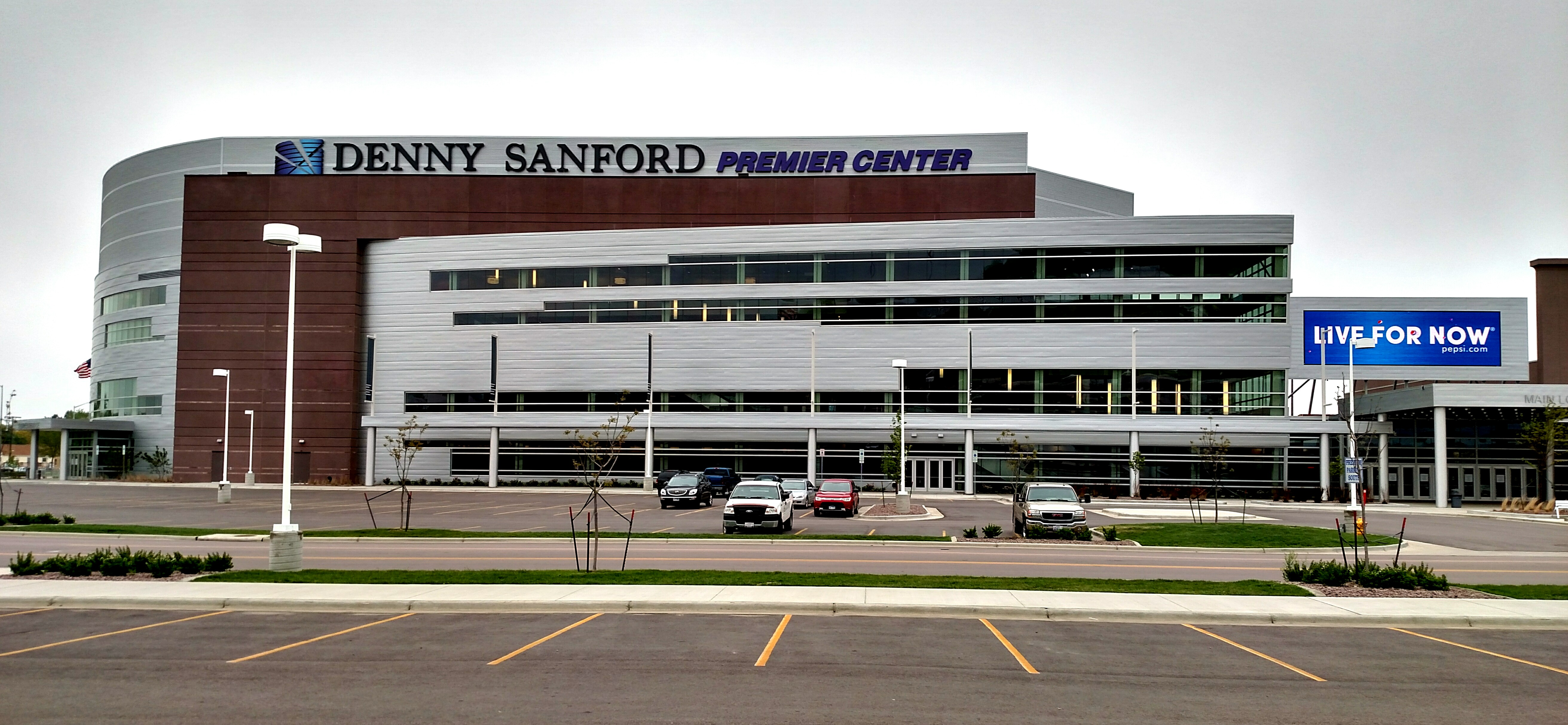
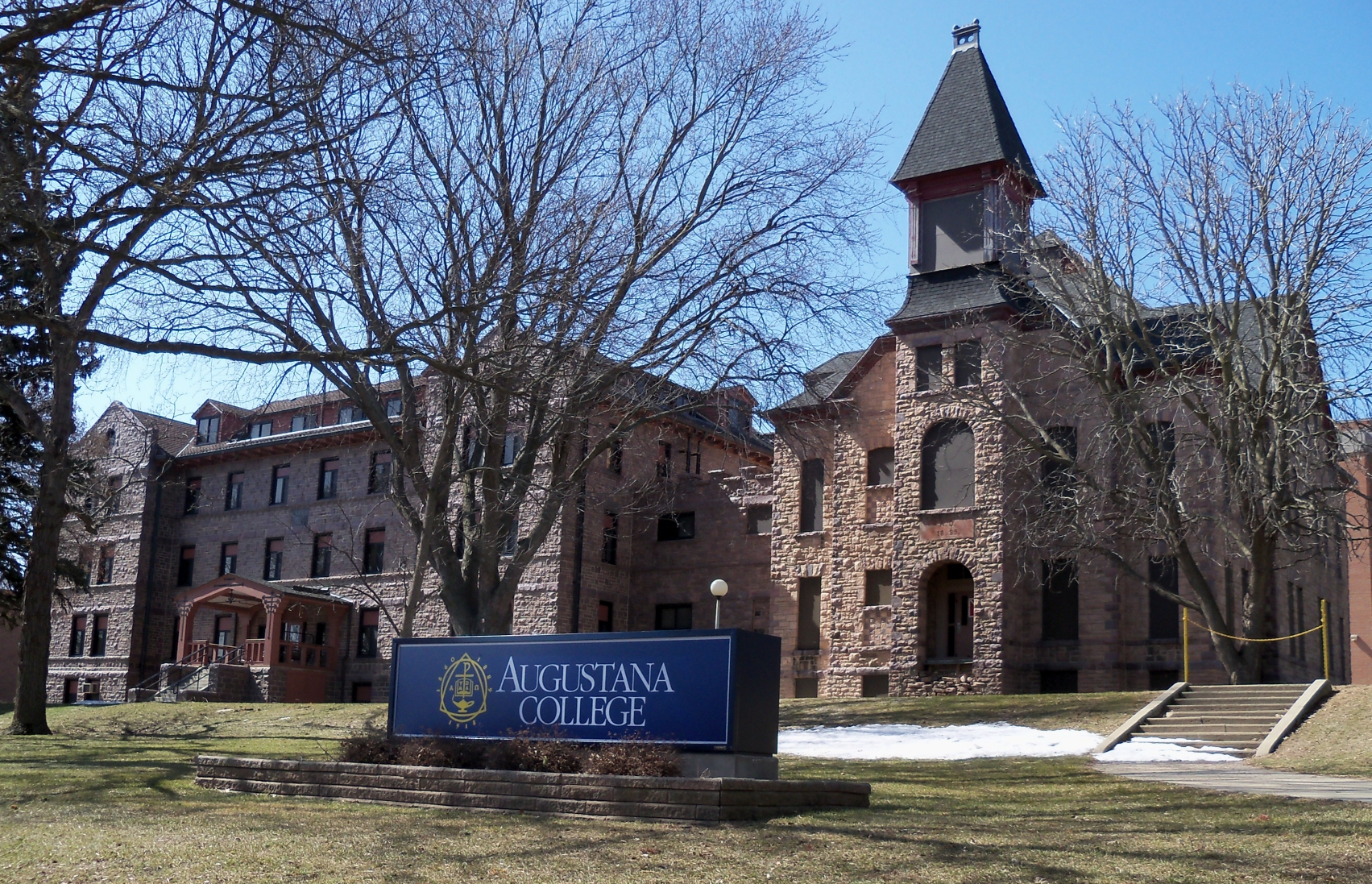
- Sioux Falls skyline as seen from Falls Park Old Minnehaha County Courthouse Washington Pavilion of Arts and Science Denny Sanford Premier Center Augustana University

- Flag Seal Logo
- Nicknames: Best Little City in America, Queen City of the West, The Heart of America
- Interactive map of Sioux Falls
- Location within South Dakota Location within the United States
- Coordinates: 43°32′11″N 96°43′54″W
- Country: United States
- State: South Dakota
- Counties: Minnehaha, Lincoln
- Founded: 1856
- Incorporated: February 4, 1879
- Named for: The waterfall of the Big Sioux River

Government
  - Mayor: Christine Erickson (R)

Area
  - City: 81.19 sq mi (210.27 km^{2})
  - Land: 80.65 sq mi (208.87 km^{2})
  - Water: 0.54 sq mi (1.40 km^{2})
- Elevation: 1,463 ft (446 m)

Population (2020)
  - City: 192,517
  - Rank: US: 114th SD: 1st
  - Density: 2,387.2/sq mi (921.72/km^{2})
  - Urban: 194,283 (US: 197th)
  - Urban density: 2,861/sq mi (1,104.8/km^{2})
  - Metro: 289,592 (US: 171st)
  - Metro density: 112.5/sq mi (43.42/km^{2})
- Demonym: Siouxlander (unofficial)
- Time zone: UTC–6 (Central (CST))
  - Summer (DST): UTC–5 (CDT)
- ZIP codes: Zip codes: 57101, 57103-57110, 57117-57118, 57186, 57188-57189, 57192-57193, 57197-57198
- Area code: 605
- FIPS code: 46-59020
- GNIS feature ID: 1267566
- Sales tax: 6.2%
- Website: siouxfalls.gov

Sioux Falls (/suː ˈfɔːlz/ soo FAWLZ) is the most populous city in the U.S. state of South Dakota. It is the county seat of Minnehaha County and also extends into northern Lincoln County. The population was 192,517 at the 2020 census (estimated at 209,289 in 2024). The Sioux Falls metropolitan area, with an estimated 308,000 residents, accounts for more than one-third of South Dakota's population. Chartered in 1856 on the banks of the Big Sioux River, the city is at the junction of Interstates 29 and 90.

== History ==
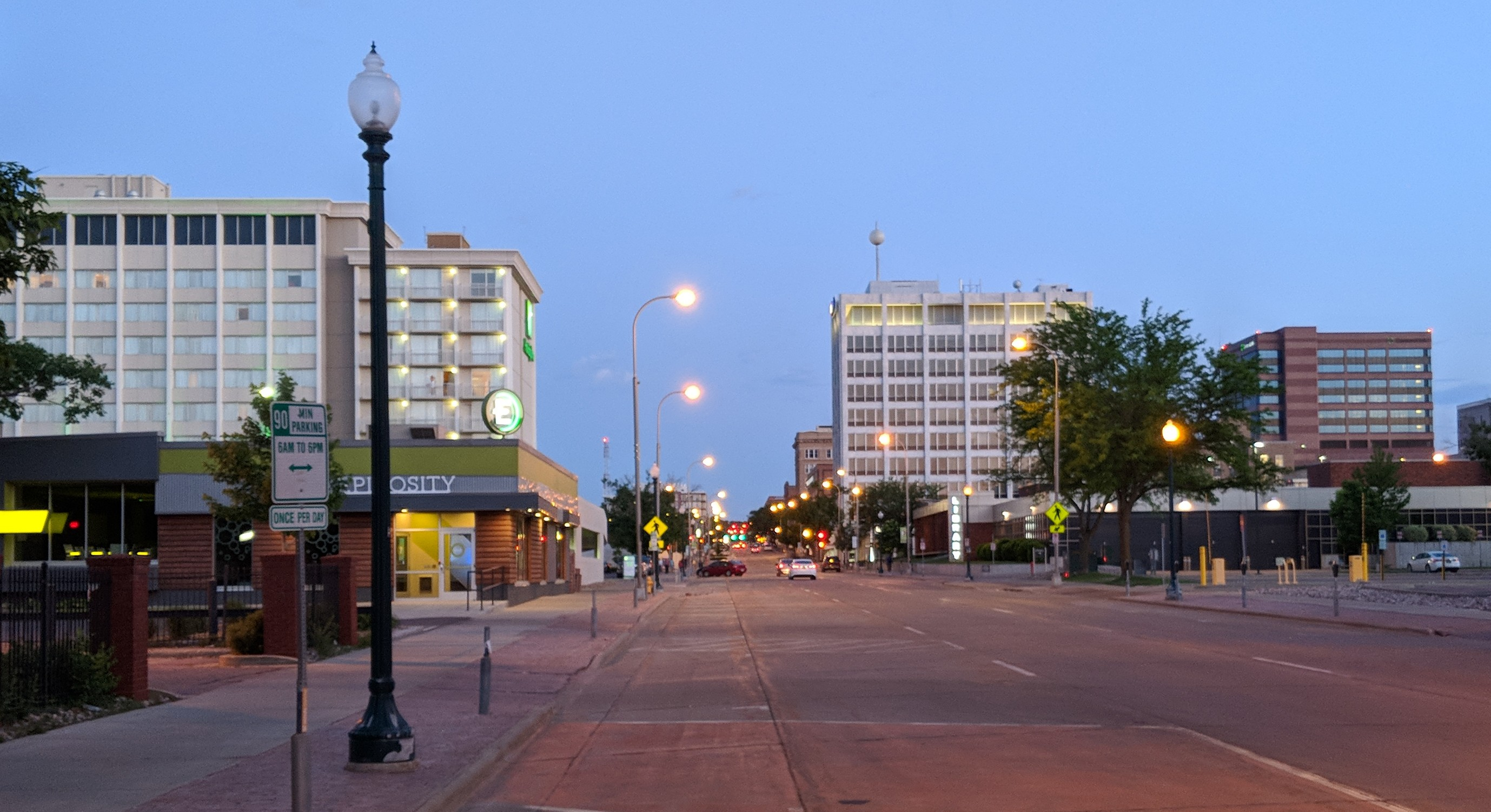
Looking south on Main Avenue

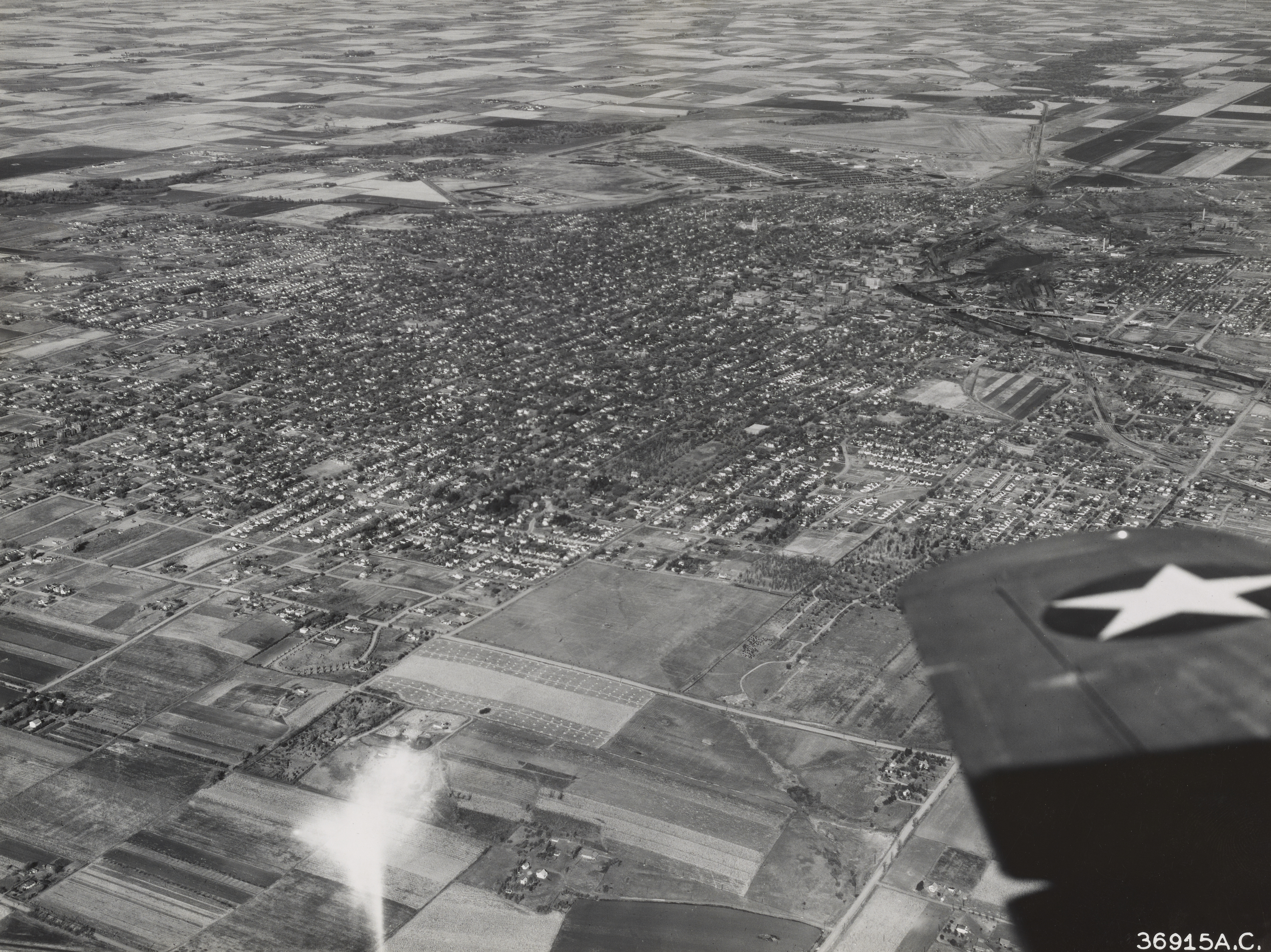
Sioux Falls from the air, October 1943

Sioux Falls's history revolves around the cascades of the Big Sioux River. The falls were created about 14,000 years ago during the last ice age. The lure of the falls has been a powerful influence. Ho-Chunk, Ioway, Otoe, Missouria, Omaha (and Ponca at the time), Quapaw, Kansa, Osage, Arikara, Sioux, and Cheyenne people first inhabited the region. Numerous burial mounds remain on the high bluffs near the river and are spread throughout the vicinity. Indigenous people maintained an agricultural society with fortified villages, and later arrivals rebuilt on many of the sites that were previously settled. Lakota still populate urban and reservation communities in the state and many Lakota, Dakota, and numerous other Indigenous Americans reside in Sioux Falls.

French voyagers/explorers visited the area in the early 18th century. The first documented visit by an American of European descent was by Philander Prescott, who camped overnight at the falls in December 1832. Captain James Allen led a military expedition out of Fort Des Moines in 1844. Jacob Ferris described the Falls in his 1856 book The States and Territories of the Great West.

Two separate groups, the Dakota Land Company of St. Paul and the Western Town Company of Dubuque, Iowa, organized in 1856 to claim the land around the falls, considered a promising townsite for its beauty and waterpower. Each laid out 320-acre (1.3 km^{2}) claims, but worked together for mutual protection. They built a temporary barricade of turf that they dubbed "Fort Sod" in response to native tribes attempting to defend their land from the settlers. Seventeen men then spent "the first winter" in Sioux Falls. The next year, the population grew to near 40.

Although conflicts in Minnehaha County between Native Americans and white settlers were few, the Dakota War of 1862 engulfed nearby southwestern Minnesota. The town was evacuated in August 1862 when two local settlers were killed as a result of the conflict. The settlers and soldiers stationed there traveled to Yankton in late August. The abandoned townsite was pillaged and burned.

Fort Dakota, a military reservation established in present-day downtown, was established in May 1865. Many former settlers gradually returned and a new wave of settlers arrived in the following years. The population grew to 593 by 1873, and a building boom was underway in that year. The Village of Sioux Falls, consisting of 1,200 acres (4.9 km^{2}), was incorporated in 1876 and granted a city charter by the Dakota Territorial legislature on March 3, 1883.

The arrival of the railroads ushered in the great Dakota Boom decade of the 1880s. Sioux Falls's population grew from 2,164 in 1880 to 10,167 in 1889, transforming the city. A severe plague of grasshoppers and a national depression halted the boom by the early 1890s. The city grew by only 89 people from 1890 to 1900.

In the 1890s Sioux Falls became a destination for women seeking divorce, as it had some of the nation's most permissive divorce laws and was accessible by rail. It was known as the "Divorce Colony" and remained a popular venue for divorces until South Dakota changed its residency requirements in 1908.

Prosperity eventually returned with the opening of the John Morrell meat packing plant in 1909, the establishment of an airbase and a military radio and communications training school in 1942, and the completion of the interstate highways in the early 1960s. Much of the growth in the first part of the 20th century was fueled by agriculturally based industry, such as the Morrell plant and the nearby stockyards (one of the largest in the nation).

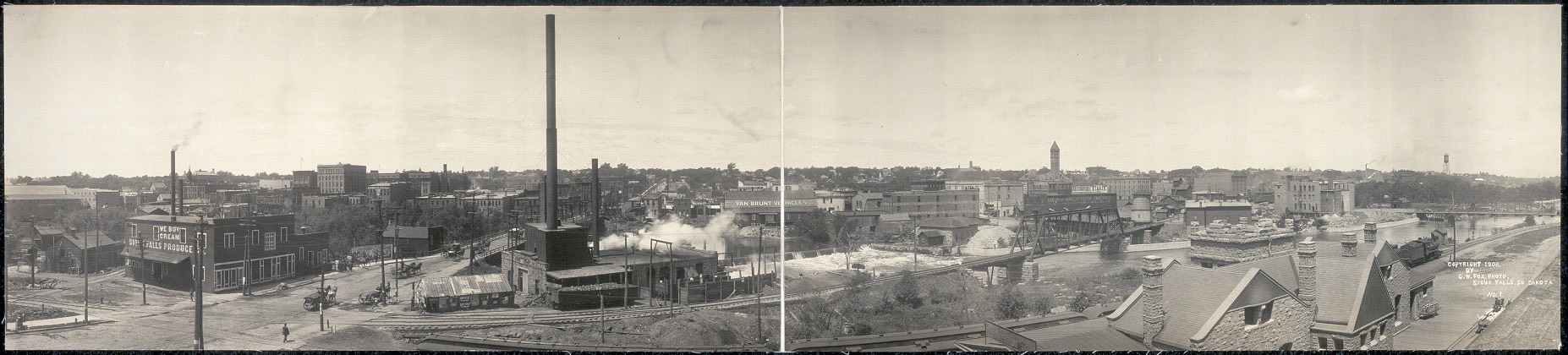
Downtown Sioux Falls in 1908, looking west

In 1955 the city consolidated the neighboring incorporated city of South Sioux Falls. At the time South Sioux Falls had a population of nearly 1,600. It was the county's third-largest city after Sioux Falls and Dell Rapids. On October 18, 1955, South Sioux Falls residents voted to consolidate with Sioux Falls. On November 15, Sioux Falls residents also voted to consolidate.

In 1981, to take advantage of recently relaxed state usury laws, Citibank relocated its primary credit card center from New York City to Sioux Falls. Some claim that this is the main reason for the increased population and job growth rates that Sioux Falls has experienced since. Others say that Citibank's relocation was only part of a more general transformation of the city's economy from industrially based to one centered on health care, finance, and retail trade.

Sioux Falls has grown rapidly since the late 1970s, with the population more than doubling from 81,182 in 1980 to 192,517 in 2020.

Then-President Bill Clinton made his final stop of the 1996 presidential campaign in Sioux Falls.

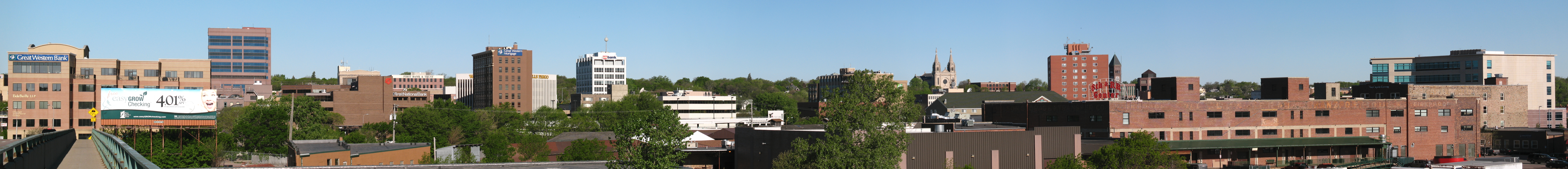
Downtown Sioux Falls in 2010, looking west

=== 2019 tornadoes ===
On the night of September 10, 2019, the south side of Sioux Falls was hit by three strong EF2 tornadoes, severely damaging at least 37 buildings, including the Plaza 41 Shopping Center. One tornado hit the Avera Heart Hospital, damaging parts of the roof and windows and injuring seven people, including a man who fractured his skull as he was thrown into an exterior wall of the hospital. Another tornado hit the commercial district near the Empire Mall, injuring one woman inside her home. Another touched down on the far south side in a suburban residential area, tearing the roofs off homes. The total damage was more than $5 million.

== Geography ==
According to the United States Census Bureau, the city has an area of 73.47 square miles (190.29 km^{2}), of which 72.96 square miles (188.97 km^{2}) is land and 0.51 square miles (1.32 km^{2}) is water. The city is in extreme eastern South Dakota, about 15 miles (24 km) west of the Minnesota border.

=== Metropolitan area ===
The Sioux Falls Metropolitan Statistical Area consists of four South Dakota counties (Lincoln, McCook, Minnehaha, and Turner) and one Minnesota county (Rock). The estimated population of this MSA in 2022 was 289,592, an increase of 4.6% from the 2020 census. In addition to Sioux Falls, the metropolitan area includes Canton, Brandon, Dell Rapids, Tea, Harrisburg, Worthing, Beresford, Lennox, Hartford, Crooks, Baltic, Montrose, Salem, Renner, Rowena, Chancellor, Colton, Humboldt, Parker, Hurley, Garretson, Sherman, Corson, Viborg, Irene, Centerville, Luverne, Hills, and Beaver Creek.

=== Climate ===
Climate chart for Sioux Falls

Due to its inland location and relatively high latitude, Sioux Falls has a humid continental climate (Köppen Dfa, bordering on Dwa) characterized by hot, humid summers and cold, dry winters. It is in USDA Plant Hardiness Zone 5a. The monthly daily average temperature ranges from 17.9 °F (−7.8 °C) in January to 74.4 °F (23.6 °C) in July; there are 15 days of maximums at or above 90 °F (32 °C) and 25 days with minimums at or below 0 °F (−18 °C) annually. Snowfall occurs mostly in light to moderate amounts during the winter, totaling 45.3 inches (115 cm). Precipitation, at 27.85 inches (707 mm) annually, is concentrated in the warmer months. This results in frequent thunderstorms in summer from convection being built up with the unstable weather patterns. Extremes range from −42 °F (−41 °C) on February 9, 1899 to 110 °F (43 °C) as recently as June 21, 1988.

Climate data for Sioux Falls (Foss Field Airport), elevation: 436 m or 1,430 ft, (Note: Considering the average elevation of the airport.) 1991–2020 normals, (Note: Mean monthly maximums and minimums (i.e. the expected highest and lowest temperature readings at any point during the year or given month) calculated based on data at said location from 1991 to 2020.) extremes 1893–present
Month	Jan	Feb	Mar	Apr	May	Jun	Jul	Aug	Sep	Oct	Nov	Dec	Year
Record high °F (°C)	66 (19)	70 (21)	89 (32)	98 (37)	104 (40)	110 (43)	110 (43)	109 (43)	104 (40)	95 (35)	82 (28)	63 (17)	110 (43)
Mean maximum °F (°C)	47.4 (8.6)	53.1 (11.7)	70.4 (21.3)	82.2 (27.9)	87.7 (30.9)	93.4 (34.1)	94.7 (34.8)	93.7 (34.3)	89.7 (32.1)	81.8 (27.7)	66.7 (19.3)	50.1 (10.1)	96.8 (36.0)
Mean daily maximum °F (°C)	27.2 (−2.7)	32.0 (0.0)	45.0 (7.2)	59.0 (15.0)	70.8 (21.6)	80.9 (27.2)	85.3 (29.6)	82.8 (28.2)	75.6 (24.2)	61.1 (16.2)	45.0 (7.2)	31.6 (−0.2)	58.0 (14.4)
Daily mean °F (°C)	17.9 (−7.8)	22.3 (−5.4)	34.7 (1.5)	47.2 (8.4)	59.1 (15.1)	69.9 (21.1)	74.4 (23.6)	72.0 (22.2)	63.8 (17.7)	49.6 (9.8)	34.8 (1.6)	22.5 (−5.3)	47.4 (8.6)
Mean daily minimum °F (°C)	8.5 (−13.1)	12.6 (−10.8)	24.3 (−4.3)	35.5 (1.9)	47.5 (8.6)	58.8 (14.9)	63.4 (17.4)	61.1 (16.2)	51.9 (11.1)	38.1 (3.4)	24.5 (−4.2)	13.4 (−10.3)	36.6 (2.6)
Mean minimum °F (°C)	−16.0 (−26.7)	−10.1 (−23.4)	−0.6 (−18.1)	18.1 (−7.7)	31.1 (−0.5)	44.4 (6.9)	49.4 (9.7)	47.4 (8.6)	33.7 (0.9)	19.8 (−6.8)	4.4 (−15.3)	−9.3 (−22.9)	−19.2 (−28.4)
Record low °F (°C)	−38 (−39)	−42 (−41)	−23 (−31)	4 (−16)	17 (−8)	32 (0)	34 (1)	34 (1)	13 (−11)	−5 (−21)	−17 (−27)	−31 (−35)	−42 (−41)
Average precipitation inches (mm)	0.60 (15)	0.83 (21)	1.60 (41)	3.00 (76)	3.86 (98)	4.23 (107)	3.25 (83)	3.34 (85)	2.73 (69)	2.36 (60)	1.22 (31)	0.83 (21)	27.85 (707)
Average snowfall inches (cm)	8.0 (20)	8.6 (22)	7.2 (18)	5.1 (13)	0.1 (0.25)	0.0 (0.0)	0.0 (0.0)	0.0 (0.0)	0.0 (0.0)	1.4 (3.6)	6.2 (16)	8.7 (22)	45.3 (115)
Average precipitation days (≥ 0.01 in)	7.0	7.0	8.2	10.2	12.1	11.8	9.0	9.4	8.1	7.9	6.2	7.0	103.9
Average snowy days (≥ 0.1 in)	7.3	6.8	5.1	2.2	0.1	0.0	0.0	0.0	0.0	0.9	3.5	6.9	32.8
Average relative humidity (%)	71.7	73.3	72.1	64.5	63.5	65.4	65.4	67.9	69.5	67.2	73.4	75.5	69.1
Average dew point °F (°C)	6.4 (−14.2)	12.6 (−10.8)	23.4 (−4.8)	33.6 (0.9)	44.8 (7.1)	55.2 (12.9)	60.6 (15.9)	58.8 (14.9)	49.5 (9.7)	36.9 (2.7)	24.4 (−4.2)	12.0 (−11.1)	34.9 (1.6)
Average ultraviolet index	1	2	4	5	7	8	9	8	6	3	2	1	5
Source 1: NOAA (relative humidity and dew point 1961–1990)
Source 2: Weather Atlas (UV index)

See or edit raw graph data.

== Demographics ==
Historical population
Census	Pop.	Note	%±
1880	2,164		—
1890	10,177		370.3%
1900	10,266		0.9%
1910	14,094		37.3%
1920	25,202		78.8%
1930	33,362		32.4%
1940	40,832		22.4%
1950	52,969		29.7%
1960	65,466		23.6%
1970	72,488		10.7%
1980	81,182		12.0%
1990	100,814		24.2%
2000	123,975		23.0%
2010	153,888		24.1%
2020	192,517		25.1%
2025 (est.)	213,748		11.0%
U.S. Decennial Census; 2020 Census

=== Racial and ethnic composition ===
Sioux Falls, South Dakota – Racial and ethnic composition Note: the US Census treats Hispanic/Latino as an ethnic category. This table excludes Latinos from the racial categories and assigns them to a separate category. Hispanics/Latinos may be of any race.
Race / Ethnicity (NH = Non-Hispanic)	Pop 2000	Pop 2010	Pop 2020	% 2000	% 2010	% 2020
Non-Hispanic White alone (NH)	112,703	130,577	149,423	90.91%	84.85%	77.62%
Black or African American alone (NH)	2,198	6,412	12,069	1.77%	4.17%	6.27%
Native American or Alaska Native alone (NH)	2,558	3,831	4,745	2.06%	2.49%	2.46%
Asian alone (NH)	1,467	2,724	5,269	1.18%	1.77%	2.74%
Pacific Islander alone (NH)	49	75	69	0.04%	0.05%	0.04%
Some Other Race alone (NH)	95	169	534	0.08%	0.11%	0.28%
Mixed Race or Multi-Racial (NH)	1,818	3,273	8,139	1.47%	2.13%	4.23%
Hispanic or Latino (any race)	3,087	6,827	12,269	2.49%	4.44%	6.37%
Total	123,975	153,888	192,517	100.00%	100.00%	100.00%

=== 2020 census ===
As of the 2020 census, Sioux Falls had a population of 192,517. The median age was 35.3 years. 24.5% of residents were under the age of 18 and 14.5% of residents were 65 years of age or older. For every 100 females there were 98.8 males, and for every 100 females age 18 and over there were 97.0 males age 18 and over.

99.8% of residents lived in urban areas, while 0.2% lived in rural areas.

There were 78,405 households in Sioux Falls, of which 29.9% had children under the age of 18 living in them. Of all households, 44.5% were married-couple households, 20.1% were households with a male householder and no spouse or partner present, and 27.2% were households with a female householder and no spouse or partner present. About 32.0% of all households were made up of individuals and 10.5% had someone living alone who was 65 years of age or older.

There were 83,504 housing units, of which 6.1% were vacant. The homeowner vacancy rate was 1.5% and the rental vacancy rate was 8.4%.

Racial composition as of the 2020 census
Race	Number	Percent
White	152,142	79.0%
Black or African American	12,190	6.3%
American Indian and Alaska Native	5,279	2.7%
Asian	5,318	2.8%
Native Hawaiian and Other Pacific Islander	74	0.0%
Some other race	5,676	2.9%
Two or more races	11,838	6.1%
Hispanic or Latino (of any race)	12,269	6.4%

=== Population estimate ===
According to city officials, the estimated population had grown to 224,676 as of early 2026.

=== 2010 census ===
As of the 2010 census, there were 153,888 people, 61,707 households, and 37,462 families residing in the city. The population density was 2,109.2 inhabitants per square mile (814.4/km^{2}). There were 66,283 housing units at an average density of 908.5 per square mile (350.8/km^{2}). The racial makeup of the city was 86.8% White, 4.2% African American, 2.7% Native American, 1.8% Asian, 0.1% Pacific Islander, 2.0% from other races, and 2.5% from two or more races. Hispanic or Latino people of any race were 4.4% of the population.

Of the 61,707 households, 31.9% had children under the age of 18 living with them, 45.5% were married couples living together, 10.9% had a female householder with no husband present, 4.4% had a male householder with no wife present, and 39.3% were non-families. 30.6% of all households were made up of individuals, and 8.7% had someone living alone who was 65 years of age or older. The average household size was 2.40 and the average family size was 3.02.

The median age in the city was 33.6 years. 24.6% of residents were under the age of 18; 10.7% were between the ages of 18 and 24; 29.7% were from 25 to 44; 24.1% were from 45 to 64; and 10.9% were 65 years of age or older. The gender makeup of the city was 49.6% male and 50.4% female.

=== 2015 American Community Survey ===
In 2015, the median household income in Minnehaha County, SD was $59,884, while Lincoln County, SD was $76,094. This represents a 0.29% growth from the previous year. The median family income for Sioux Falls was $74,632 in 2015. Males had a median income of $40,187 versus $31,517 for females. The per capita income for the county was $26,392. 11.8% of the population and 8.5% of families were below the poverty line. Out of the total population, 16.8% of those under the age of 18 and 8.8% of those 65 and older were living below the poverty line.

=== Immigration history ===
Many European immigrants, primarily from Scandinavia, Germany and the British Isles, settled in South Dakota in the 19th century. By 1890, one-third of the residents of South Dakota were immigrants.

=== Religion ===
Lutheran make up the largest proportion of Sioux Falls residents; Catholics are the second-largest. The Evangelical Lutheran Church in America is the city's largest Lutheran denomination, with 20 churches in Sioux Falls. Sioux Falls has three mosques and about 3,000 Muslims. It also has South Dakota's only Hindu temple, Hindu Temple of Siouxland, in the suburb of Tea. A synagogue affiliated with the Reform Judaism movement, Mt. Zion Congregation, serves Sioux Falls's Jewish community.

== Economy ==
=== Top employers ===
According to the city's 2022 Comprehensive Annual Financial Report, the city's largest employers are:

#	Employer	Industry	# of Employees	Percentage
1	Sanford Health	Health Care	11,010	6.9%
2	Avera Health	Health Care	7,888	4.9%
3	Sioux Falls School District	Education	3,688	2.1%
4	Smithfield Foods (John Morrell)	Meat Processing	3,400	2.3%
5	Hy-Vee	Retail Grocery	2,806	1.8%
6	Wells Fargo	Financial	2,035	1.3%
7	Walmart/Sam's Club	Retail	1,547	1.0%
8	City of Sioux Falls	Government	1,477	0.9%
9	Citigroup	Financial	1,400	0.8%
10	Department of Veterans Affairs Medical & Regional Office	Medical	1,214	0.9%
—	Total employers	—	36,465	22.8%

Partially due to the lack of a state corporate income tax, Sioux Falls is home to a number of financial companies. The largest employers among these are Wells Fargo and Citigroup.

While no longer as economically dominant as it once was, the manufacturing and food processing sector remains an important component of Sioux Falls's economy. The Smithfield Foods/John Morrell meatpacking plant is the city's third-largest employer.

== Arts and culture ==
=== Events ===
Downtown Sioux Falls hosts a SculptureWalk every summer and "First Fridays" on the first Friday of each summer month. The annual Downtown Riverfest embraces the beauty of the Big Sioux with live music, art, and kids' activities.

Festival of Bands is a regional competition that hosts over 40 marching bands each year from across the Midwest. The Sioux Empire Spectacular is a Drum Corps regional competition. Party in the Park is an annual outdoor musical event held at Terrace Park. The Sioux Empire Fair is a regional fair held at the W. H. Lyon Fairgrounds, and the Sioux Falls JazzFest is held at Yankton Trail Park each year.

SiouxperCon is an annual nonprofit fan convention that celebrates comic books, sci-fi, fantasy, anime, board games, and video gaming.

=== Arts ===
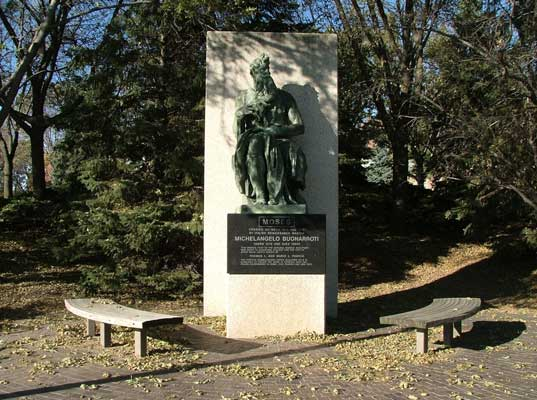
Replica of Michelangelo's Moses at Augustana University

At the beginning of the 21st century, Sioux Falls experienced a renaissance of cultural interest. The Sioux Empire Arts Council continues to lead in the Sioux Falls area arts scene and gives out Mayor's Awards each year in several categories for excellence demonstrated by Sioux Falls residents. The Sioux Falls SculptureWalk was the first visual evidence of the renaissance and is an attraction for both visitors and resident artists, hosting over 55 sculptures, including a replica of the Michelangelo's David. Work was essential to the renovation of the original Washington High School into the Washington Pavilion (housing two performing arts, a visual arts, and a science center).

The Northern Plains Indian Art Market (NPIAM) was established in 1988 by American Indian Services, Inc., of Sioux Falls as the Northern Plains Tribal Arts Show (NPTA). Northern Plains Tribal Arts dominated the Sioux Falls art scene from its inception in 1988. American Indian Services produced the juried art show and market from 1988 to 2003. Since 2004, Sinte Gleska University of Rosebud has been the producing organization. In the first 25 years of its existence—one of the longest-running Indian art shows in the country—over 800 artists from 7 northern plains states and two Canadian provinces exhibited at NPTA/NPIAM. Writers for national publications, filmmakers, and researchers have all joined the audiences over the years.

A permanent Northern Plains Tribal Arts collection is housed in the Egger Gallery at the Washington Pavilion. Since the Washington Pavilion opened its doors to the public in 1999, the collection has called the Visual Arts Center home. Originally the pieces were on an extended loan from American Indian Services, Inc.; in 2013, thanks to many supporters, the works were acquired under the title of the Augustana Tribal Arts Collection, and now officially belong to the Visual Arts Center.

As the 21st century began, poetry and literary events became more popular with the opening of the Sioux Empire Arts Council Horse Barn Gallery and due to a National Endowment for the Arts-supported Y Writer's Voice. The Y Writer's Voice included an annual reading series of 38 nationally known poets and writers, who performed works and youth workshops through the Sioux Falls Writers Voice in local performance spaces, at the YMCA after-school program, and in local schools, gaining national attention.

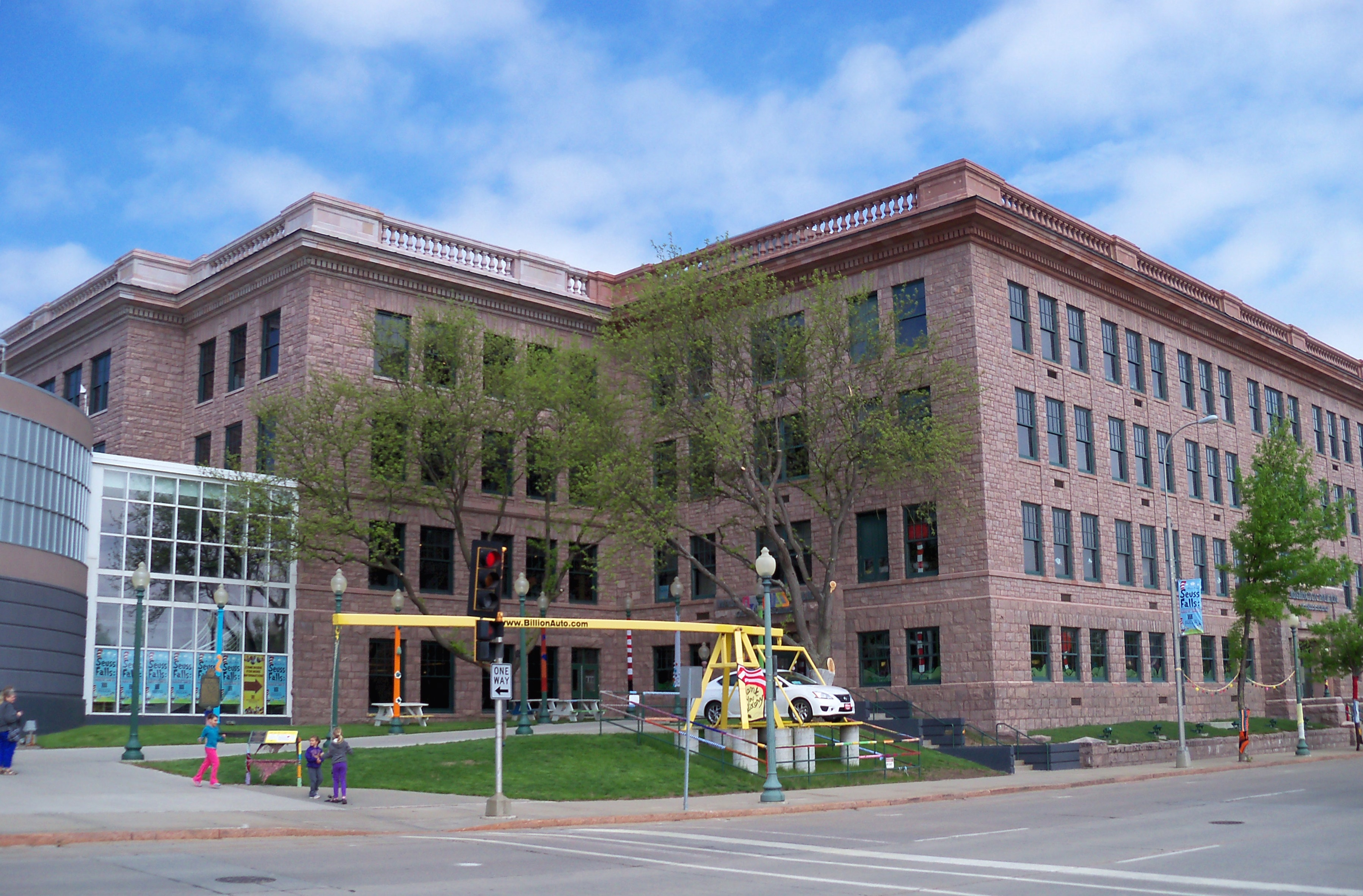
Washington Pavilion of Arts and Science

The Sioux Falls mayor's awards in literary arts designated movers and shakers during the growth and development of the literary arts scene. In addition to literary awards, there are mayor's awards in visual arts, performing arts, music, organizing in the arts, advocacy, and lifetime achievement, per the mayor's discretion.

The Sioux Falls Jazz and Blues Festival was a three-day outdoor musical event featuring two stages and is free to the public. It was held the third weekend in July at Yankton Trail Park. The Sioux Falls Jazz & Blues Society hosted national musicians during its annual concert series. Each year the series included approximately five concerts with acts from all over the world. JazzFest, with over 125,000 in annual attendance, expanded over the years to include the Jazziest Diversity Project, the All-City Jazz Ensemble, the Concert Series, and JazzFest Jazz Camp. 2016 was the festival's 25th anniversary year. The SF Jazz and Blues Society (the hosts of the event) dissolved in 2023.

In 2019, Levitt at the Falls launched its first season of free concerts in a state-of-the-art outdoor amphitheater in Falls Park West. Downtown Sioux Falls boasts Ipso Gallery. the Orpheum Theater, SculptureWalk, The Premiere Playhouse, The Good Night Theatre Collective, Sioux Falls State Theater, the Museum of Visual Materials, the Interactive Water Fountain, Falls Park, Creative Spirits, Eastbank Art Gallery, Levitt at the Falls, and the Washington Pavilion, home to the South Dakota Symphony Orchestra, the occasional Poets & Painters show, and the Spotlight Theatre Collective (formerly known as the Dakota Academy of Performing Arts.)

=== Landmarks ===
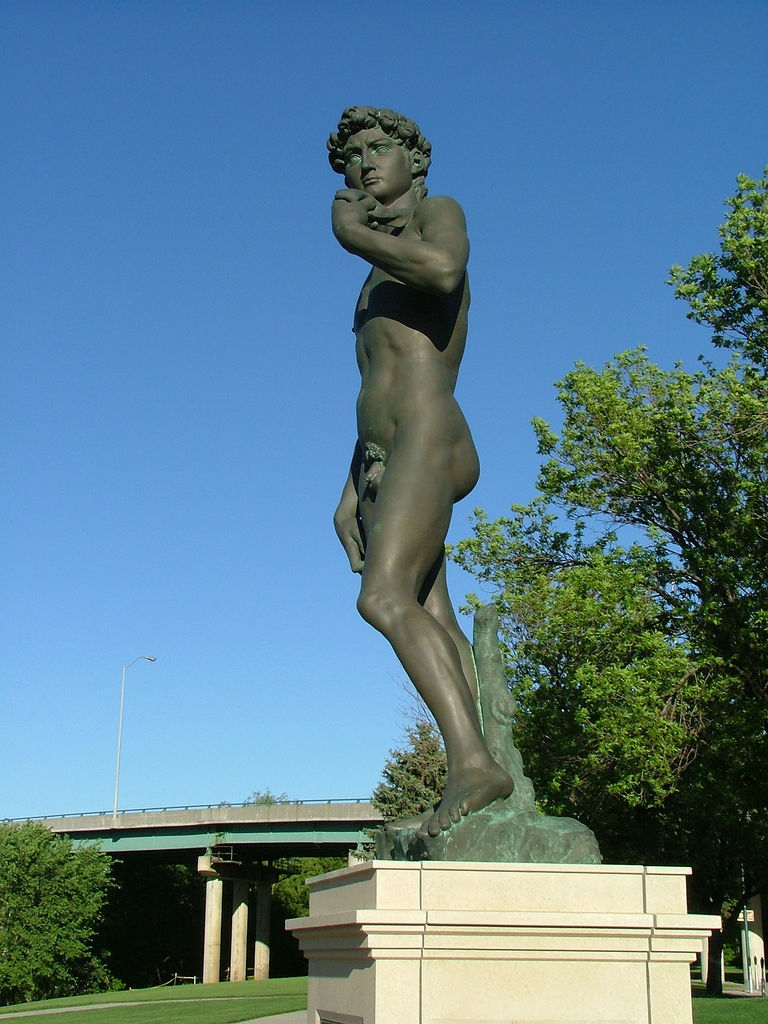
Replica of Michelangelo's David in Fawick Park

The Washington Pavilion contains the Kirby Science Discovery Center and two performing arts centers that host Broadway productions and operas. The South Dakota Symphony's home hosts dance groups and smaller theater and choral events. The Visual Arts Center, also part of the Pavilion complex, hosts six galleries of changing exhibits, all free of charge. The Wells Fargo Cinedome is a multi-format 60 ft (18 m) dome theater that plays several films each month. The Cinedome also hosts the Sweetman Planetarium, which presents at least one show daily.

The Great Plains Zoo & Delbridge Museum provides the area with natural history and animal exhibits in its 50-acre (200,000 m^{2}) park. The taxidermy animals once hosted within the Delbridge Museum were removed in 2023 due to health concerns of the high amounts of arsenic in the mounts.

The USS South Dakota Battleship Memorial to the World War II battleship USS South Dakota is on State Highway 42 (West 12th Street) and Kiwanis Avenue.

The 114th Fighter Wing is at Joe Foss Field and houses F-16C/D fighter aircraft. The SDANG unit is known for its support of community activities and services.

A replica of Michelangelo's David is near the downtown area at Fawick Park.

== Sports ==
Club	League	Venue	Established	Championships
Sioux Falls Canaries	AAIPB, Baseball	Sioux Falls Stadium	1993	1
Sioux Falls Stampede	USHL, Ice hockey	Denny Sanford Premier Center	1999	4
Sioux Falls Storm	IFL, Indoor football	Denny Sanford Premier Center	2000	11
Sioux Falls Skyforce	NBA G League, Basketball	Sanford Pentagon	1989	3
Sioux Falls Thunder FC	NPSL, Soccer	McEneaney Field	2017	0
Sioux Falls City FC	WPSL, Soccer	University of Sioux Falls	2022	0

The Sioux Falls Canaries were known as the Sioux Falls Fighting Pheasants from 2010 to 2013. Patrick Mahomes Sr. pitched for the Sioux Falls Canaries in 2007 and 2008.

=== Special sporting events ===
Sioux Falls has several multipurpose athletic stadiums: the primarily baseball Sioux Falls Stadium, indoor Sioux Falls Arena, indoor Sanford Pentagon, and indoor Denny Sanford Premier Center. Sioux Falls Stadium hosted the 2007 American Association of Independent Professional Baseball all-star game.

Constructed in 2014, the Denny Sanford Premier Center is home to the Summit League's men's and women's basketball tournaments. The Premier Center also hosted the 2016 Division I Women's Tournament Regional as well as the 2017 USHL/NHL Top Prospects Game.

== Government ==
Mayor and city council (2026)
Mayor	Christine Erickson
Central	Zack Okuwe
Northeast	Miranda Basye
Northwest	Jennifer Sigette
Southeast	Sara Pankonin
Southwest	Ryan Spellerberg
At-large	James Oppenheimer
At-large	Rich Merkouris
At-large	Richard Thomason

Sioux Falls has a mayor–council (strong mayor) form of government. Mayoral and city council elections occur every four years. Not all council members are elected in the same year, as the elections are staggered in even-numbered years. The council consists of five members elected to represent specific sections of the city and three who represent the city as a whole (that is, at-large). The council member position is designed to be part-time. Sioux Falls operates under a home rule charter as permitted by the South Dakota constitution.

In the 2004 presidential election, George W. Bush won both Minnehaha and Lincoln counties, receiving 56% and 65% of the vote, respectively. In 2008, Barack Obama won Minnehaha County by 0.7% while John McCain won Lincoln County by 15%. Both counties have voted for the Republican nominee in every presidential election since 2012.

== Education ==
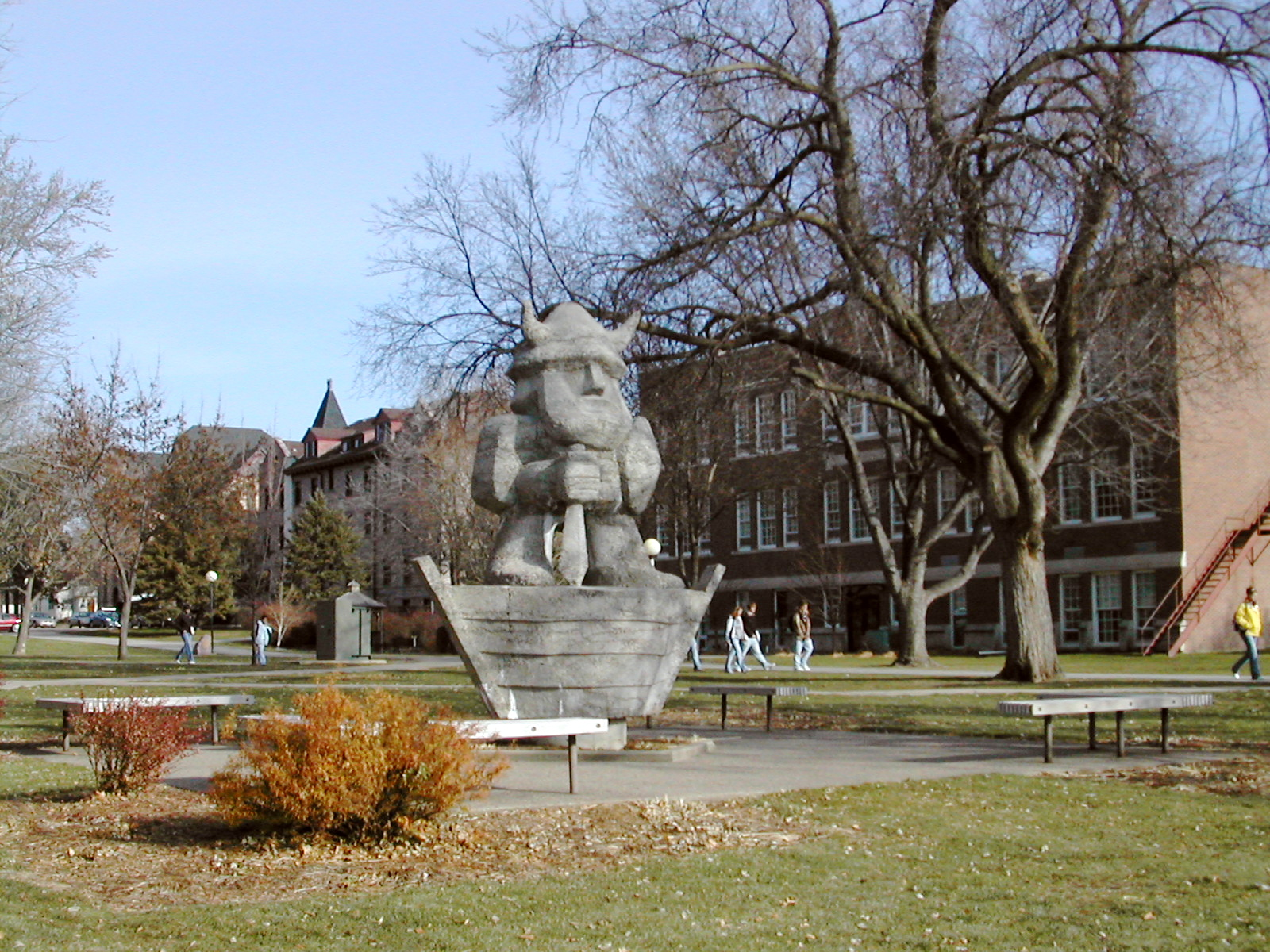
Augustana University's mascot, Ole, with the Administration Building, East Hall, and Old Main visible in the background

=== Higher education ===
Sioux Falls is home to Augustana University, the University of Sioux Falls, Sioux Falls Seminary, Southeast Technical College, National American University, the South Dakota School for the Deaf, the University of South Dakota's Sanford School of Medicine (Sioux Falls campus), Stewart School and the South Dakota Public Universities and Research Center (formerly known as USDSU).

=== Public schools ===
The Sioux Falls School District, which covers the majority of Sioux Falls, serves over 23,000 students living in Sioux Falls and some of its surrounding suburbs. There are 25 elementary schools, seven middle schools, and six high schools, including:

- Axtell Park Building
- Career and Technical Education Academy
- Jefferson High School
- Lincoln High School
- Roosevelt High School
- Washington High School

Other school districts in Minnehaha County that cover parts of Sioux Falls are Tea Area School District 41-5, Brandon Valley School District 49-2, Tri-Valley School District 49-6, and Lennox School District 41-4. In Lincoln County, other districts that cover parts of Sioux Falls are Tea Area and Harrisburg School District 41-2.

=== Private schools ===
Bishop O'Gorman Catholic Schools is a centralized Catholic school system that includes eight schools: six elementary schools (St. Mary, St. Lambert, St. Michael-St. Katharine Drexel, Holy Spirit and Christ the King); one junior high (O'Gorman Junior High); and one high school, O'Gorman. The junior and senior high O'Gorman schools are on the same campus. About 2,800 students attend Bishop O'Gorman Catholic Schools. As of the 2009–10 school year the Sioux Falls Catholic School system's St. Joseph Cathedral School was closed.

The Lutheran Church-Missouri Synod operates two schools in Sioux Falls. Sioux Falls Lutheran School is on 37th street, while the Lutheran High School of Sioux Falls is on Western Avenue. In 2018, voters approved a plan to move Sioux Falls Lutheran School to a new building near the I-29/I-229 merge on south Boe Lane. Students moved to the new building at the beginning of the Spring 2020 semester.

The Wisconsin Evangelical Lutheran Synod has two schools in Sioux Falls: Bethel Lutheran and Good Shepherd Lutheran.

Other private schools include Sioux Falls Christian Schools, Christian Center, The Baan Dek Montessori, Cornerstone School, and the Open Arms Christian Child Development Center.

== Infrastructure ==
=== Transportation ===
==== Roads ====
Highways include:

- Interstate 90
- Interstate 29
- Interstate 229

==== Public/mass transit ====
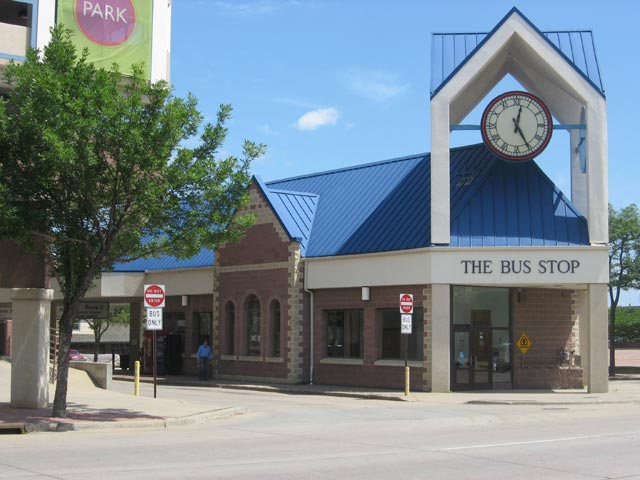
Main downtown bus terminal

Sioux Area Metro, the local public transit organization, operates 16 bus lines within the city, with most routes operating Monday through Saturday. The Sioux Area Metro Paratransit serves members of the community who would otherwise not be able to travel by providing door-to-door service. Public transportation is supplemented with the SAM On Demand service that offers microtransit options.

Jefferson Lines runs long-distance bus routes to the Sioux Falls Bus Station. Non-transfer destinations include Grand Forks, Kansas City, Minneapolis, and Omaha. Until 1965 a branch of the Milwaukee Road train from Chicago, the Arrow, made a stop in Sioux Falls.

==== Air ====
Many domestic airlines serve Sioux Falls Regional Airport.

==== Rail ====
The BNSF Railway provides freight rail service. Amtrak does not directly serve any community in South Dakota. The closest station is in Omaha, nearly 200 miles away.

== Sister cities ==
Sioux Falls' sister cities are:

- Newry, Mourne and Down District Council, Northern Ireland, United Kingdom
- Potsdam, Germany

== See also ==
- The Divorce Colony
- Impact of the COVID-19 pandemic on the meat industry in the United States
- List of cities in South Dakota
- Pandora Papers
