= National Register of Historic Places listings in Minnehaha County, South Dakota =

Location of Minnehaha County in South Dakota

This is a list of the National Register of Historic Places listings in Minnehaha County, South Dakota.

This is intended to be a complete list of the properties and districts on the National Register of Historic Places in Minnehaha County, South Dakota, United States. The locations of National Register properties and districts for which the latitude and longitude coordinates are included below, may be seen in a map.

There are 105 properties and districts listed on the National Register in the county. Five other properties were once listed but have been removed.

This National Park Service list is complete through NPS recent listings posted October 16, 2026.

== Current listings ==
	Name on the Register	Image	Date listed	Location	City or town	Description
1	All Saints Historic District	All Saints Historic District	February 23, 1984 (#84003349)	Roughly Main to 2nd Ave. from 14th to 23rd Sts., and 18th to 21st Sts. to 5th Ave. 43°32′11″N 96°43′30″W	Sioux Falls	
2	All Saints School Main Building	All Saints School Main Building	March 14, 1973 (#73001748)	101 W. 17th St. 43°32′14″N 96°43′40″W	Sioux Falls	
3	Archaeological Site 39MH0005		December 15, 2023 (#100008359)	Address Restricted	Sioux Falls vicinity	
4	Augustana College Historic Buildings	Augustana College Historic Buildings	March 25, 1977 (#77001250)	29th and S. Summit Sts. 43°31′34″N 96°44′12″W	Sioux Falls	
5	Austin-Olson Farm		December 14, 1995 (#95001474)	24993 465th Ave. 43°45′46″N 96°54′42″W	Colton	
6	Berdahl-Rolvaag House	Berdahl-Rolvaag House	January 23, 1979 (#79002405)	1009 W. 33rd St. 43°31′14″N 96°44′21″W	Sioux Falls	Building moved to Granite, Iowa in 2022.
7	Berg and Estensen Store	Berg and Estensen Store	November 8, 2001 (#01001224)	110 Zeliff Ave. 43°45′29″N 96°28′33″W	Sherman	No longer extant per Google Earth.
8	Marion E. Bowen House	Marion E. Bowen House	May 28, 1976 (#76001748)	840 W. 9th St. 43°32′50″N 96°44′16″W	Sioux Falls	
9	Brandon Village		June 14, 2001 (#01000664)	Address Restricted	Brandon	
10	Bridge at Iverson Crossing	Bridge at Iverson Crossing	July 17, 1996 (#96000746)	48054 266th St. 43°31′44″N 96°36′02″W	Brandon	
11	Brooks Brothers Home	Brooks Brothers Home	October 24, 1996 (#96001225)	1006-1008 South Dakota Ave. 43°32′10″N 96°43′45″W	Sioux Falls	
12	Margaret Burger Apartment House	Margaret Burger Apartment House	January 4, 2021 (#100005893)	619 South Main Ave. 43°32′26″N 96°43′42″W	Sioux Falls	
13	Building at 330 South 1st Avenue	Building at 330 South 1st Avenue	January 23, 2013 (#12001217)	330 S. 1st Avenue; 43°32′38″N 96°43′30″W	Sioux Falls	
14	Building at 529 North Main	Building at 529 North Main	January 14, 2005 (#04001489)	529 N. Main Ave. 43°43′04″N 96°30′11″W	Garretson	
15	Gina Smith Campbell Bathhouse	Gina Smith Campbell Bathhouse	February 13, 1986 (#86000246)	City Park, Beach Ave. extension 43°49′12″N 96°42′06″W	Dell Rapids	
16	Carnegie Free Public Library	Carnegie Free Public Library	March 14, 1973 (#73001750)	235 W. 10th St. 43°32′45″N 96°43′46″W	Sioux Falls	
17	Carnegie Public Library	Carnegie Public Library	February 13, 1986 (#86000247)	513 N. Orleans; 43°49′30″N 96°42′36″W	Dell Rapids	
18	Carpenter Hotel	Carpenter Hotel	August 13, 1986 (#86001499)	221 S. Phillips Ave. 43°32′43″N 96°43′36″W	Sioux Falls	
19	Cathedral Historic District	Cathedral Historic District	June 5, 1974 (#74001896)	Bounded by W. 4th and 10th Sts., Spring, Prairie, and Summit Aves.; also roughly bounded by West 9th and West 10th Sts., South Prairie, North Trapp, and South Menlo Aves. 43°33′00″N 96°44′06″W	Sioux Falls	Known as the Sioux Falls Historic District until 2011; boundary increase approved June 29, 2023
20	Central Fire Station	Central Fire Station	May 27, 1980 (#80003730)	100 S. Minnesota Ave. 43°32′49″N 96°43′51″W	Sioux Falls	
21	Cherry Rock Park Bridge	Cherry Rock Park Bridge	May 30, 2003 (#03000499)	Cherry Rock Park; 43°32′16″N 96°42′17″W	Sioux Falls	
22	Edward Coughran House	Edward Coughran House	May 28, 1976 (#76001749)	1203 S. 1st Ave. 43°32′04″N 96°43′31″W	Sioux Falls	
23	E.J. and Alice Daniels House	E.J. and Alice Daniels House	October 19, 1989 (#89001724)	3901 S. Hawthorne; 43°30′34″N 96°44′56″W	Sioux Falls	
24	Dell Rapids Amphitheater	Dell Rapids Amphitheater	February 15, 2002 (#02000020)	City park 43°49′15″N 96°42′11″W	Dell Rapids	
25	Dell Rapids Bridge	Dell Rapids Bridge	August 5, 1999 (#99000952)	Local road over the Big Sioux River; 43°49′12″N 96°42′35″W	Dell Rapids	Also known as the South Dakota Department of Transportation Bridge 50-210-018. Bridge was added again in January 2000 under a separate duplicate NRHP listing, ID#00000021. Entire bridge replaced in 2014.
26	Dell Rapids Historic District	Dell Rapids Historic District	February 23, 1978 (#78002563)	335-536 E. 4th St. 43°49′24″N 96°42′36″W	Dell Rapids	
27	Dell Rapids Residential Historic District	Dell Rapids Residential Historic District	October 12, 2000 (#00001224)	Roughly bounded by Orleans Ave., 4th St., and 7th St. 43°49′30″N 96°42′17″W	Dell Rapids	
28	Dell Rapids Warming House		February 27, 2017 (#100000691)	State Ave. 43°49′16″N 96°42′30″W	Dell Rapids	Warming hut used by ice skaters on the Big Sioux River
29	Dell Rapids Water Tower	Dell Rapids Water Tower	February 23, 1984 (#84003356)	10th and Orleans; 43°49′47″N 96°42′32″W	Dell Rapids	
30	Harrison DeLong House	Harrison DeLong House	October 12, 2000 (#00001221)	621 S. Main; 43°32′27″N 96°43′41″W	Sioux Falls	
31	East Side Fire Station and Branch Library	East Side Fire Station and Branch Library	June 26, 2019 (#100004124)	600 E. 7th St. 43°33′00″N 96°43′10″W	Sioux Falls	
32	Eighth Street Bridge	Eighth Street Bridge	December 9, 1993 (#93001308)	S. 8th St. over the Big Sioux River; 43°32′55″N 96°43′31″W	Sioux Falls	
33	Farley-Loetscher Company Building	Farley-Loetscher Company Building	January 26, 2001 (#01000020)	701-705 E. 8th St. 43°32′54″N 96°43′05″W	Sioux Falls	
34	Farley-Loetscher Company Building I	Farley-Loetscher Company Building I	February 5, 2003 (#02001766)	322 and 324 E. 8th St. 43°32′55″N 96°43′51″W	Sioux Falls	
35	Ole E. Fauske House	Ole E. Fauske House	October 29, 2021 (#100007110)	26003 482nd Ave. 43°36′58″N 96°34′19″W	Corson	
36	Federal Building and U.S. Courthouse	Federal Building and U.S. Courthouse	May 2, 1974 (#74001894)	400 S. Phillips Ave. 43°32′36″N 96°43′33″W	Sioux Falls	
37	First Congregational Church	First Congregational Church	August 18, 1983 (#83003012)	303 S. Dakota Ave. 43°32′40″N 96°43′48″W	Sioux Falls	
38	First National Bank of Garretson	First National Bank of Garretson	November 2, 2011 (#11000787)	605 Main St. 43°42′59″N 96°30′10″W	Garretson	
39	Josephine Martin Glidden Memorial Chapel	Josephine Martin Glidden Memorial Chapel	September 25, 1987 (#87001732)	2121 E. 12th St. 43°32′37″N 96°41′58″W	Sioux Falls	
40	Glidden-Martin Hall	Glidden-Martin Hall	November 8, 2000 (#00001350)	1101 W. 22nd Ave. 43°31′58″N 96°44′19″W	Sioux Falls	
41	The Gloria House	The Gloria House	July 20, 2000 (#00000828)	1216 S. Center Ave. 43°32′03″N 96°43′42″W	Sioux Falls	
42	Grand Lodge and Library of the Ancient Free and Accepted Masons	Grand Lodge and Library of the Ancient Free and Accepted Masons	May 28, 1976 (#76001750)	415 S. Main Ave. 43°32′34″N 96°43′42″W	Sioux Falls	
43	Hayes Historic District	Hayes Historic District	February 14, 2006 (#06000049)	Roughly bounded by W. 22nd St. to W. 26th St. and by South Dakota Ave. to S. Phillips Ave. 43°32′04″N 96°43′43″W	Sioux Falls	
44	Orlan A. Hayward House	Orlan A. Hayward House	December 2, 1998 (#98001406)	1509 S. Glendale; 43°32′27″N 96°44′42″W	Sioux Falls	
45	Hans J. Hilmoe Barn		June 28, 2010 (#10000410)	47170 Homestead St. 43°46′06″N 96°46′35″W	Baltic vicinity	Built in 1911 by Norwegian immigrants
46	Andrew O. Huseboe House	Andrew O. Huseboe House	July 13, 1988 (#88000569)	223 S. Prairie Ave. 43°32′44″N 96°44′14″W	Sioux Falls	
47	Illinois Central Passenger Depot	Illinois Central Passenger Depot	August 18, 1983 (#83003013)	Big Sioux River at 8th St. 43°32′58″N 96°43′24″W	Sioux Falls	
48	Jorden Hall	Jorden Hall	November 8, 2000 (#00001349)	1101 W. 22nd St. 43°31′56″N 96°44′19″W	Sioux Falls	
49	Andrew Kuehn Warehouse	Andrew Kuehn Warehouse	February 25, 1982 (#82003933)	401 N. Phillips Ave. 43°33′05″N 96°43′37″W	Sioux Falls	
50	L & A Baking Company	L & A Baking Company	November 20, 2007 (#07001214)	910 N. Main Ave. 43°33′29″N 96°43′39″W	Sioux Falls	
51	LaSalle Apartments	LaSalle Apartments	September 14, 1998 (#98001125)	703 S. Summit; 43°32′38″N 96°44′09″W	Sioux Falls	
52	Daniel Lund House	Daniel Lund House	February 18, 2000 (#00000123)	628 W. 20th 43°32′07″N 96°43′59″W	Sioux Falls	
53	McKennan Park Historic District	McKennan Park Historic District	June 6, 1984 (#84003359)	McKennan Park, 2nd and 4th Aves. from 21st to 26th Sts., and 21st St. from Phillips to 7th Aves.; also roughly bounded by 1st Ave., S., Phillips Ave., 24th St., E., and 26th St. 43°31′56″N 96°43′17″W	Sioux Falls	Second set of boundaries represents a boundary increase
54	L.D. Miller Funeral Home	L.D. Miller Funeral Home	August 18, 1983 (#83003014)	507 S. Main Ave. 43°32′33″N 96°43′42″W	Sioux Falls	
55	William G. Milne House	William G. Milne House	December 1, 1994 (#94001391)	508 E. 9th St. 43°49′42″N 96°42′30″W	Dell Rapids	
56	John Mundt Building	John Mundt Building	February 17, 1981 (#81000575)	103 N. Main Ave. 43°37′20″N 96°56′44″W	Hartford	
57	Odd Fellows Home of Dell Rapids	Odd Fellows Home of Dell Rapids	February 21, 2012 (#12000037)	100 W. 10th St. 43°49′45″N 96°43′06″W	Dell Rapids	
58	Old Courthouse and Warehouse Historic District	Old Courthouse and Warehouse Historic District	August 18, 1983 (#83003015)	Roughly bounded by the Big Sioux River, 4th and 6th Sts., and Dakota Ave.; also roughly bounded by North Dakota Ave., 4th St., the Big Sioux River, and 7th St. 43°33′06″N 96°43′37″W	Sioux Falls	Second set of boundaries represents a boundary increase
59	Old Minnehaha County Courthouse	Old Minnehaha County Courthouse	May 10, 1973 (#73001749)	Main Ave. at 6th St. 43°33′06″N 96°43′43″W	Sioux Falls	
60	Old Yankton Bridge	Old Yankton Bridge	August 5, 1999 (#99000955)	Old Yankton Rd. over the Big Sioux River; 43°30′05″N 96°45′03″W	Sioux Falls	
61	Orpheum Theatre	Orpheum Theatre	June 23, 1983 (#83003016)	315 N. Phillips Ave. 43°33′03″N 96°43′37″W	Sioux Falls	
62	Palisades Bridge	Palisades Bridge	June 3, 1999 (#99000687)	25495 485th Ave. 43°41′20″N 96°31′05″W	Garretson	
63	Parmley-Pankow House	Parmley-Pankow House	January 28, 2004 (#03001528)	613 S. Main; 43°32′27″N 96°43′41″W	Sioux Falls	
64	R.F. Pettigrew and S.L. Tate Building	R.F. Pettigrew and S.L. Tate Building	November 6, 1986 (#86002991)	121-123 S. Main Ave. 43°33′01″N 96°43′39″W	Sioux Falls	
65	Phillips Block	Phillips Block	January 18, 1978 (#78002564)	333-335 N. Main Ave. 43°33′03″N 96°43′43″W	Sioux Falls	
66	Plumbing Supply Company	Plumbing Supply Company	January 14, 2005 (#04001488)	326 E. 8th St. 43°33′03″N 96°43′24″W	Sioux Falls	
67	Presentation Children's Home	Presentation Children's Home	February 10, 1993 (#92001852)	701 S. Western Ave. 43°32′23″N 96°45′04″W	Sioux Falls	
68	Queen Bee Mill	Queen Bee Mill	August 1, 1984 (#84003362)	N. Weber Ave., Falls Park; 43°33′25″N 96°43′19″W	Sioux Falls	
69	Dr. Fredrich A. Randolph Block	Dr. Fredrich A. Randolph Block	March 17, 1994 (#94000195)	320 N. Main; 43°33′11″N 96°43′59″W	Sioux Falls	
70	Renner Ball Park	Renner Ball Park	November 8, 2006 (#06001007)	0.75 miles (1.21 km) west of the intersection of 258th St. and Highway 115; 43°38′49″N 96°43′38″W	Renner	
71	Renner Lutheran Sanctuary	Renner Lutheran Sanctuary	May 7, 1980 (#80003729)	West of South Dakota Highway 115; 43°38′44″N 96°42′58″W	Renner	
72	Grant J. Reynolds House	Grant J. Reynolds House	December 2, 1998 (#98001400)	800 S. Hawthorne St. 43°32′10″N 96°44′47″W	Sioux Falls	
73	Rock Island Depot	Rock Island Depot	February 15, 1974 (#74001895)	201 E. 10th St. 43°32′45″N 96°43′29″W	Sioux Falls	
74	Security Bank Building	Security Bank Building	February 23, 1984 (#84003366)	101 S. Main Ave. 43°32′50″N 96°43′42″W	Sioux Falls	
75	Shafer Round Barn	Shafer Round Barn	December 14, 1995 (#95001470)	1600 S. Powder House Rd. 43°32′31″N 96°38′58″W	Sioux Falls	
76	Sherman Historic District	Sherman Historic District	January 28, 2004 (#03001529)	Roughly bounded by W. 18th St. to W. 22nd St., and S. Dakota Ave. to S. Main St. 43°32′05″N 96°43′43″W	Sioux Falls	
77	Shriver-Johnson Building	Shriver-Johnson Building	June 17, 1982 (#82003934)	230 S. Phillips Ave. 43°32′41″N 96°43′34″W	Sioux Falls	
78	Sioux Falls Downtown Historic District	Sioux Falls Downtown Historic District	December 1, 1994 (#94001393)	Roughly bounded by S. Dakota and S. 1st Aves., W. 9th and W. 14th Sts. 43°32′49″N 96°43′43″W	Sioux Falls	
79	Sioux Falls Light and Power Hydro Electric Plant	Sioux Falls Light and Power Hydro Electric Plant	February 3, 1993 (#92001854)	N. Weber Ave. on the eastern bank of the Big Sioux River; 43°33′25″N 96°43′15″W	Sioux Falls	
80	Sioux Falls National Bank Building	Sioux Falls National Bank Building	March 26, 1979 (#79002406)	100 N. Phillips Ave. 43°32′51″N 96°43′35″W	Sioux Falls	
81	Slip Up Creek Homestead		August 15, 2003 (#03000761)	25359 478th Ave. 43°42′42″N 96°39′10″W	Garretson	
82	South Dakota Department of Transportation Bridge No. 50-122-155		January 28, 2000 (#00000022)	Local road over Skunk Creek; 43°37′25″N 96°53′08″W	Brandon Township	Replaced in 2000
83	South Dakota Department of Transportation Bridge No. 50-193-086		January 14, 2000 (#99001695)	Local road over the Big Sioux River near Midway; 43°43′12″N 96°44′54″W	Sverdrup Township	Bridge removed in 2013
84	South Dakota Dept. of Trans. Bridge No. 50-196-104		February 10, 2000 (#00000098)	Local road over the Big Sioux River; 43°41′45″N 96°44′15″W	Sverdrup Township	
85	South Dakota School for the Deaf	South Dakota School for the Deaf	June 14, 1981 (#81000576)	1800 E. 10th St. 43°32′51″N 96°42′10″W	Sioux Falls	
86	South Dakota State Penitentiary Historic Buildings	South Dakota State Penitentiary Historic Buildings	April 20, 1978 (#78002565)	1600 North Dr. 43°34′03″N 96°43′29″W	Sioux Falls	
87	South Side Fire Station No. 3	South Side Fire Station No. 3	February 23, 1984 (#84003369)	1324 S. Minnesota Ave. 43°32′00″N 96°43′51″W	Sioux Falls	
88	Split Rock Creek Park Historic District	Split Rock Creek Park Historic District	July 20, 2000 (#00000827)	Roughly 1 mile (1.6 km) north of Garretson in Split Rock Park; 43°43′14″N 96°30′07″W	Garretson	
89	Split Rock Park Bridge	Split Rock Park Bridge	December 9, 1993 (#93001309)	Split Rock Park Rd. over Devils Creek Gulch; 43°43′20″N 96°30′02″W	Garretson	
90	R.D. and Mary Springer House	R.D. and Mary Springer House	December 13, 1995 (#95001436)	201 W. 19th St. 43°32′09″N 96°43′37″W	Sioux Falls	
91	St. Peter's Lutheran Church	St. Peter's Lutheran Church	February 15, 2002 (#02000018)	701 North Orleans; 43°49′34″N 96°42′37″W	Dell Rapids	
92	Stadum-Green House	Stadum-Green House	July 31, 2017 (#100001401)	2101 S. Pendar Ln. 43°31′34″N 96°43′24″W	Sioux Falls	
93	Dr. Steven's House	Dr. Steven's House	October 31, 2002 (#02001286)	21 S. Riverview Heights; 43°31′59″N 96°45′27″W	Sioux Falls	
94	Stock Yards State Bank and Tri-State Wholesale Grocery Co.	Stock Yards State Bank and Tri-State Wholesale Grocery Co.	January 28, 2004 (#03001530)	201/207/211 N. Weber Ave. 43°32′55″N 96°43′11″W	Sioux Falls	
95	Terrace Park and Japanese Gardens	Terrace Park and Japanese Gardens	September 1, 2015 (#15000566)	1100 W. 4th St. 43°33′15″N 96°44′30″W	Sioux Falls	
96	Texaco Super Service Station	Texaco Super Service Station	January 23, 2013 (#12001218)	330 S. 1st Avenue; 43°32′37″N 96°43′30″W	Sioux Falls	
97	Charles A. Thomas House	Charles A. Thomas House	October 31, 1985 (#85003450)	620 S. Dakota Ave. 43°32′27″N 96°43′43″W	Sioux Falls	
98	Thompson Farmstead		February 18, 1999 (#99000239)	47339 248th St. 43°47′03″N 96°44′27″W	Dell Rapids	
99	Tolefsons Beef Stock Farm		February 14, 2002 (#02000019)	24450 458th Ave. 43°50′36″N 97°02′39″W	Colton	
100	John W. Tuthill Lumber Company	John W. Tuthill Lumber Company	August 24, 2006 (#06000459)	311 E. 8th St. 43°33′01″N 96°43′24″W	Sioux Falls	
101	Valley Springs Rest Stop Tipi	Valley Springs Rest Stop Tipi	January 20, 2015 (#14001183)	Mi. 412.1 on I-90 West; 43°36′37″N 96°27′37″W	Valley Springs vicinity	
102	Washington High School	Washington High School	February 13, 1986 (#86000248)	315 S. Main; 43°32′38″N 96°43′43″W	Sioux Falls	
103	Laura M. Welch House	Laura M. Welch House	March 7, 2000 (#00000122)	1218 S. Willow Ave. 43°32′06″N 96°45′00″W	Sioux Falls	
104	Williams Piano Company House	Williams Piano Company House	October 12, 2000 (#00001223)	1019 S. Norton; 43°32′09″N 96°44′06″W	Sioux Falls	
105	Willow Grove Farm	Willow Grove Farm	May 30, 2003 (#03000497)	47480 258th Ave. 43°40′24″N 96°43′36″W	Renner	

== Former listings ==
	Name on the Register	Image	Date listed	Date removed	Location	City or town	Description
1	Blackstone Court Apartments		June 17, 1982 (#82003932)	January 12, 1988	303 W. 12th St.	Sioux Falls	Demolished in December, 1987.
2	South Dakota Department of Transportation Bridge No. 50-122-155		August 5, 1999 (#99000956)	March 26, 2008	Local Rd. over Skunk Creek	Brandon Township	
3	South Dakota Department of Transportation Bridge No. 50-192-132		January 14, 2000 (#99001694)	March 26, 2008	Local Rd. over Big Sioux R. (Mapleton Township)	Renner	
4	South Dakota Department of Transportation Bridge No. 50-200-035	South Dakota Department of Transportation Bridge No. 50-200-035	December 9, 1993 (#93001267)	December 15, 1999	County road over the Big Sioux River	Dell Rapids vicinity	
5	Summit Avenue Viaduct		December 9, 1993 (#93001307)	March 26, 2008	Summit Ave. over the former Chicago and North Western railroad tracks 43°32′27″N 96°44′08″W	Sioux Falls	

== See also ==
- List of National Historic Landmarks in South Dakota
- National Register of Historic Places listings in South Dakota
