= List of the oldest buildings in South Dakota =

This article lists the oldest extant buildings in South Dakota, including extant buildings and structures constructed prior to and during the United States rule over South Dakota. Only buildings built prior to 1870 are suitable for inclusion on this list, or the building must be the oldest of its type.

In order to qualify for the list, a structure must:

- be a recognizable building (defined as any human-made structure used or intended for supporting or sheltering any use or continuous occupancy);
- incorporate features of building work from the claimed date to at least 1.5 metres (4.9 ft) in height and/or be a listed building.

This consciously excludes ruins of limited height, roads and statues. Bridges may be included if they otherwise fulfill the above criteria. Dates for many of the oldest structures have been arrived at by radiocarbon dating or dendrochronology and should be considered approximate. If the exact year of initial construction is estimated, it will be shown as a range of dates.

== List of oldest buildings ==
Building	Image	Location	First built	Use	Notes
Fort Sisseton		Britton, South Dakota	1864	Fort	Possibly one of the oldest buildings in South Dakota
110 S. Court Street		Vermillion, South Dakota	1868	Residence	Possibly oldest house in Vermillion
Herman Luce Cabin		Lake Herman State Park in Madison, South Dakota	1870-1871	Residence	Log cabin
Ohlman-Shannon House		Yankton, South Dakota	1871	Residence	
Cataract Hotel (South Dakota)		Sioux Falls, South Dakota	1871	Residence	Oldest building in Sioux Falls; now located at 120 South Duluth Avenue where it is an apartment building.
Methodist Episcopal Church (Scotland, South Dakota)		Scotland, South Dakota	1872	Residence	
623 W 8th Street		Sioux Falls, South Dakota	1872	Residence	
Tabor School		Tabor, South Dakota	1873	School	former log school, now Czech Heritage Preservation Society
Governor John L. Pennington House		Yankton, South Dakota	1875	Residence	home during 1875 to 1891 of Dakota Territory governor John L. Pennington
Dr. Flick Cabin at Way Park Museum		Custer, South Dakota	1875	Residence	
Pap Madison Cabin		Rapid City, South Dakota	1876	Residence	Oldest building in Rapid City area; Log cabin, moved to museum grounds.
Oahe Chapel		northwest of Pierre, South Dakota	1877	Church	Congregational mission church
Brown Earth Presbyterian Church		Grant County, South Dakota	1877	Church	Log church
Slip Up Creek Homestead		Minnehaha County, South Dakota	1877	Residence	
Renner Lutheran Church		Renner, South Dakota	1878	Church	Likely oldest surviving church building still operating in South Dakota
Old St. Wenceslaus Catholic Parish House		Tabor, South Dakota	1878	Church	Parish House
Bruce-Donaldson House		Yankton, South Dakota	1879	Residence	Listed on NRHP
Rosebud Hotel		Rosebud, South Dakota	1879	Hotel	located in Rosebud, the government center of the Rosebud Indian Reservation
St. Lawrence O'Toole Catholic Church		Central City, South Dakota	1879	Church	Former church; Listed on NRHP
Joe Kirby Home		Sioux Falls, South Dakota	1880	Residence	
I. W. Goodner House		Pierre, South Dakota	1881-1885	Residence	One of the oldest houses in Pierre; built for Clerk of SD Supreme Court

== See also ==
- National Register of Historic Places listings in South Dakota
- History of South Dakota
- Oldest buildings in the United States
