= Security Bank Building =

Security Bank Building may refer to:

- Los Angeles Theatre Center (Los Angeles, California), formerly known as Security National Bank Building, NRHP-listed
- Pacific Southwest Building (Fresno, California), formerly known as Security Bank Building
- Security Bank Building (Anniston, Alabama), NRHP-listed
- Security Bank Building (Sioux Falls, South Dakota), NRHP-listed
