= Terrace Park =

Terrace Park is the name of some places in the United States:

- Terrace Park, Ohio, a village in Ohio, United States
- Terrace Park (Sioux Falls, South Dakota), a public park in Sioux Falls, South Dakota, United States
- Terrace Park (Tampa), a neighborhood within the City of Tampa, Florida, United States
