= Sioux Falls Light and Power Hydro Electric Plant =

- U.S. National Register of Historic Places
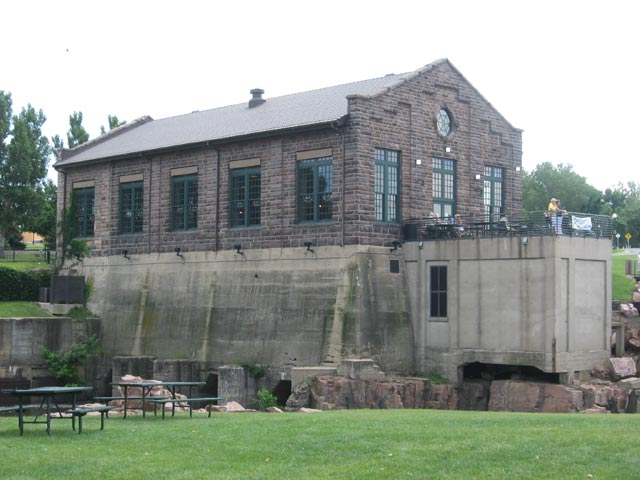

- Location within South Dakota Location within the United States
- Location: North Weber Avenue on east bank of Big Sioux River, Sioux Falls, South Dakota
- Coordinates: 43°33′25.7″N 96°43′17.8″W
- Area: less than one acre
- Built: 1908
- Architect: A.M. Byllesby; E.C. Braun
- Architectural style: Industrial architecture
- NRHP reference No.: 92001854
- Added to NRHP: February 3, 1993

The Sioux Falls Light and Power Hydro Electric Plant, formerly the Northern States Power Building, is a historic building in Falls Park in Sioux Falls, South Dakota. Originally built as a hydroelectric power plant on the Big Sioux River, it now houses the Falls Overlook Cafe. It was listed on the National Register of Historic Places in 1993.

== History ==
At the turn of the 20th century, Sioux Falls had begun to experiment with electricity, initially in the form of commercial and street lighting in the downtown area. At this time, electricity was not widespread and was only very rarely used in residences and most businesses. Electric lampposts had been installed in downtown Sioux Falls in 1887 and were operated by the gas-based Cascade Milling Company until 1905, at which time the city cancelled their contact, sparking a battle amongst local companies over the rights to acquire their operation, and whether their electricity should be privatized at all or instead come from the city. After a legal battle that reached the South Dakota Supreme Court, the city went with Bennett/Sioux Falls Electric Light and Power Company to power the lamps, which was cancelled in 1907 over "poor performance".

The Sioux Falls Light and Power Company was founded in 1905 by Eugene Coughran, with the intent of using hydroelectric power from the Big Sioux River and creating a dam on Lake Poinsett. Backed by local investors and media, it acquired the Queen Bee Mill (by that time already disused) and the Cascade Mill Company power plant. Construction on the new hydroelectric plant building was finished in 1908. In 1911, the new plant began offering its services publicly, expanding to farms, businesses, and houses. It also supplied the energy needed to power the city's trolley transportation system, for which it installed three new generators between 1910 and 1917. The Sioux Falls Light and Power Company changed its name to Consumers Power Company in 1914 and again to the Northern States Power Company. By 1914, public support was again on the rise for a municipal-based electricity plant; and by 1920, the city had secured the funding to expand their small 1901 power plant to be able to accommodate widespread distribution.

On February 3, 1993, the Sioux Falls Light and Power Hydro Electric Plant was listed on the National Register of Historic Places for its important role in the industrial history of Sioux Falls. The industrial fittings were removed and the space was renovated to be used as a public restaurant, the Falls Overlook Cafe.

== Location and architecture ==
Located in Falls Park on the Big Sioux River in Sioux Falls, South Dakota, it is situated just downstream of the Sioux Falls. It is a short distance north of the Queen Bee Mill ruins.

The hydroelectric plant sits on a poured concrete foundation, atop a natural outcropping of Sioux quartzite, about 40 feet (12 m) above the riverbank. Its walls are made of rough-hewn Sioux quartzite blocks. It is one story with a gable roof, above which the main east and west faces of the building rise, creating a false front effect. Both faces are divided into three bays, with one large central door with two rectangular windows to each side and a circular window above it. The side walls (the north and south faces) have five bays each. Several additions to the building were made after its construction but all have since been demolished, and the original building is the only one that still exists today. A patch of lighter quartzite on the building's southern face is evidence of one demolished extension.

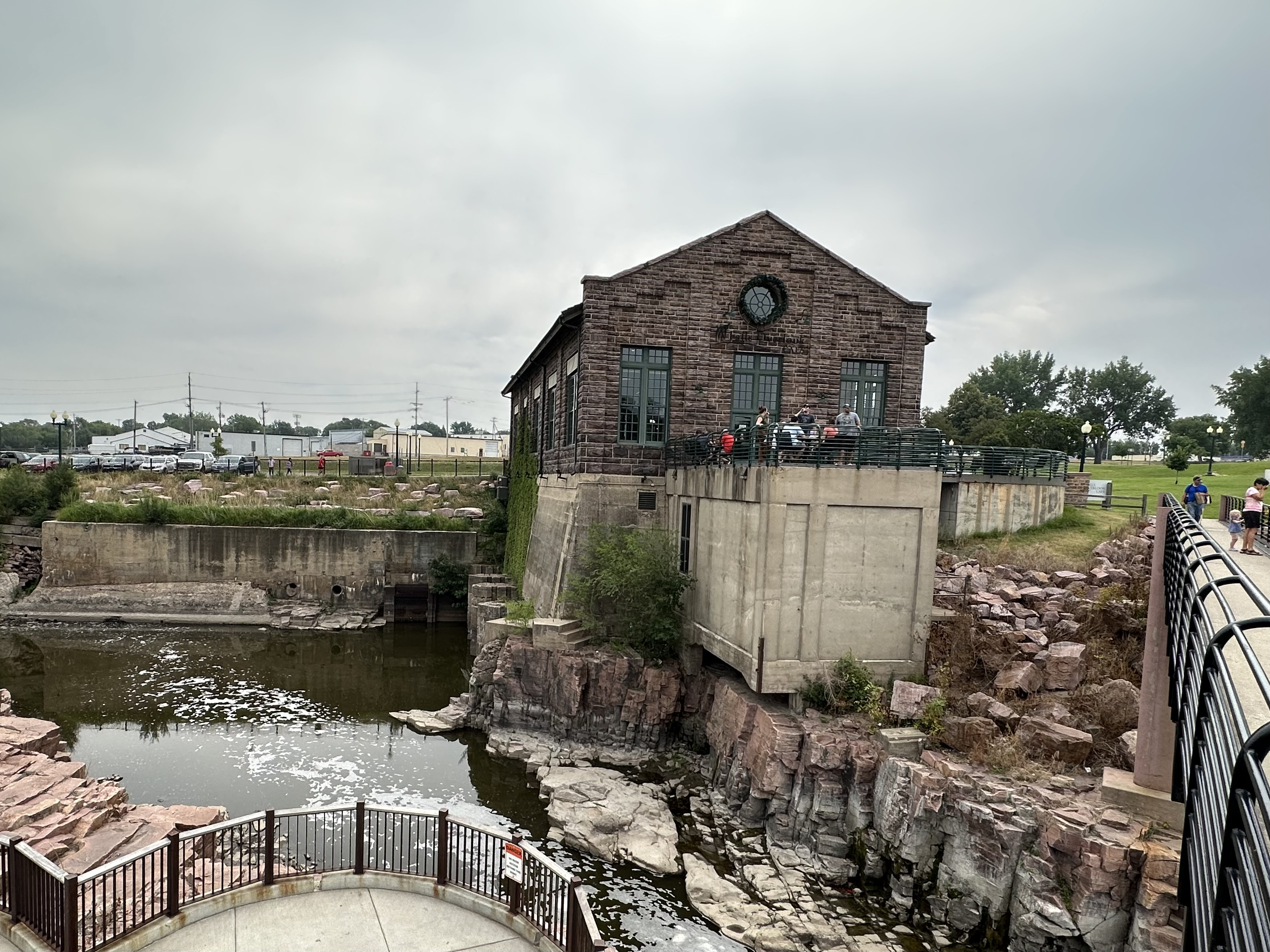
Falls Overlook Cafe

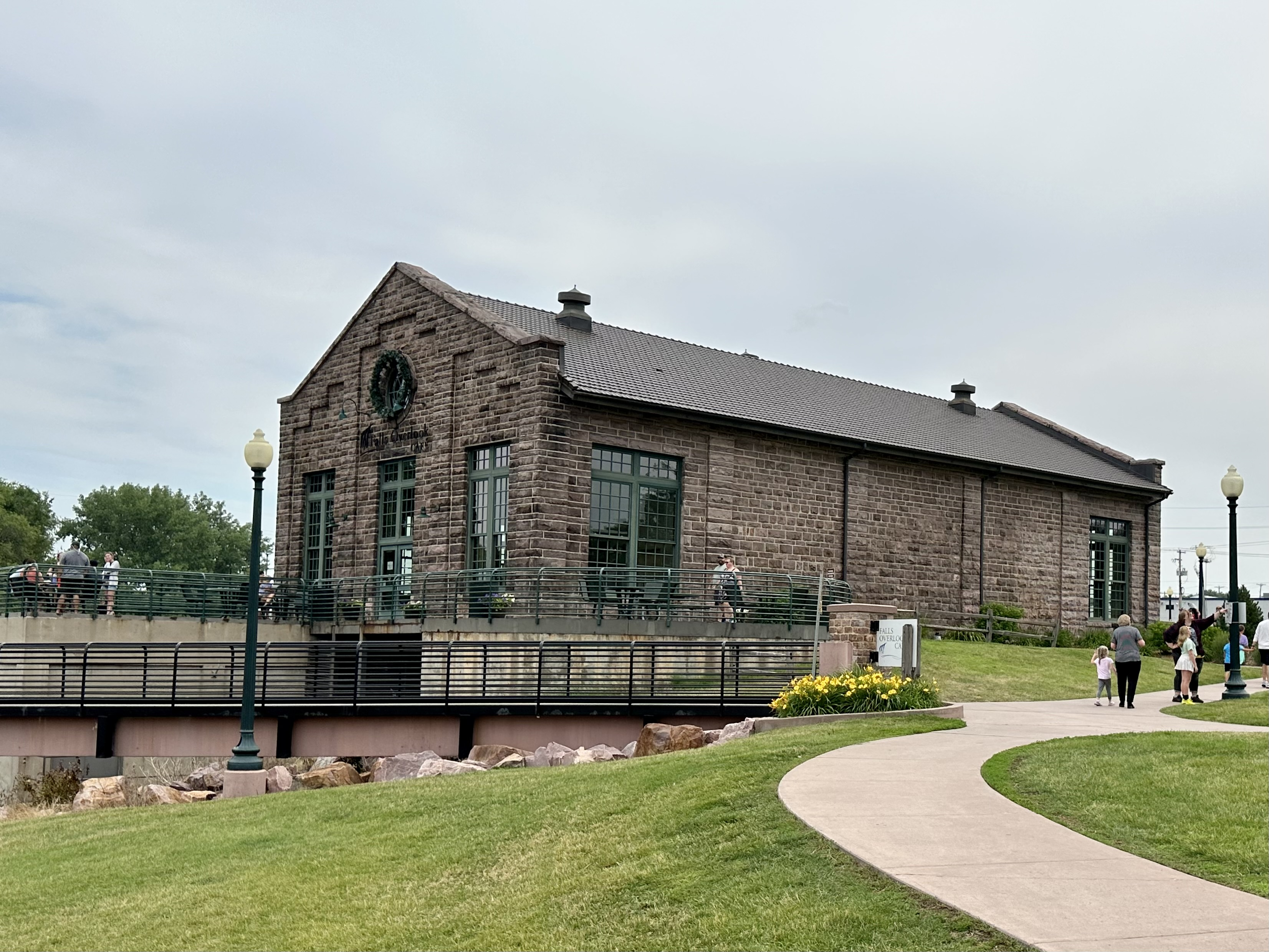
The Falls Overlook Cafe is housed inside the 1908 Sioux Falls Light & Power Co. hydroelectric plant
