= Renner Ball Park =

- U.S. National Register of Historic Places

- Location within South Dakota Location within the United States
- Location: 3/4 mi. W of 258th Street and SD 115 intersection, Renner, South Dakota
- Coordinates: 43°38′49″N 96°43′38″W
- Area: 5 acres (2.0 ha)
- Built: 1921
- NRHP reference No.: 06001007
- Added to NRHP: November 8, 2006

Renner Ball Park is a historic 5-acre (2.0 ha) baseball field on the outskirts of Renner, South Dakota, United States. It is the home of the Renner Monarchs. It was listed on the National Register of Historic Places on November 8, 2006, for its contributions to South Dakotan baseball.

The town of Renner has had a long, significant history with baseball. It was built in 1921 to host baseball games that had been held on local farms since 1899. Renner Ball Park is named after the founding family of Renner, who also owned the land the baseball field was built on. Electricity was not installed until 1950, and all prior games had to be played during the daytime. The Renner Monarchs attended the 1939 Amateur World Series national playoffs at Battle Creek, Michigan; Renner lost against Chicago Heights, 6–5. Lasting 17 innings, this was the longest game ever played in the Amateur World Series' history. At the time, Renner was the smallest town to ever qualify for a national playoff. 1939 was the first year Renner won the state championships, and they have won 20 others as of 2021. Renner has hosted the South Dakota state baseball championship four times as of 2006. In 1982, the South Dakota Legislature named Renner the "Baseball Capitol of South Dakota".

Renner Ball Park is one of the oldest still-standing original baseball fields in the United States. In the 1950s, several renovations were carried out to repair flood damage; the field was elevated and resurfaced, and the dugouts were raised to prevent rainwater accumulation. A 1963 storm destroyed the grandstand's roof and a new one was installed. The original concession stand was replaced with a new one in 1996. The field is surrounded by a chain-link fence on most sides; a wooden fence surrounds the outfield. A new scoreboard replaced the old one in the outfield in 2021.
