= I. W. Goodner House =

Historic house in South Dakota, United States

- U.S. National Register of Historic Places
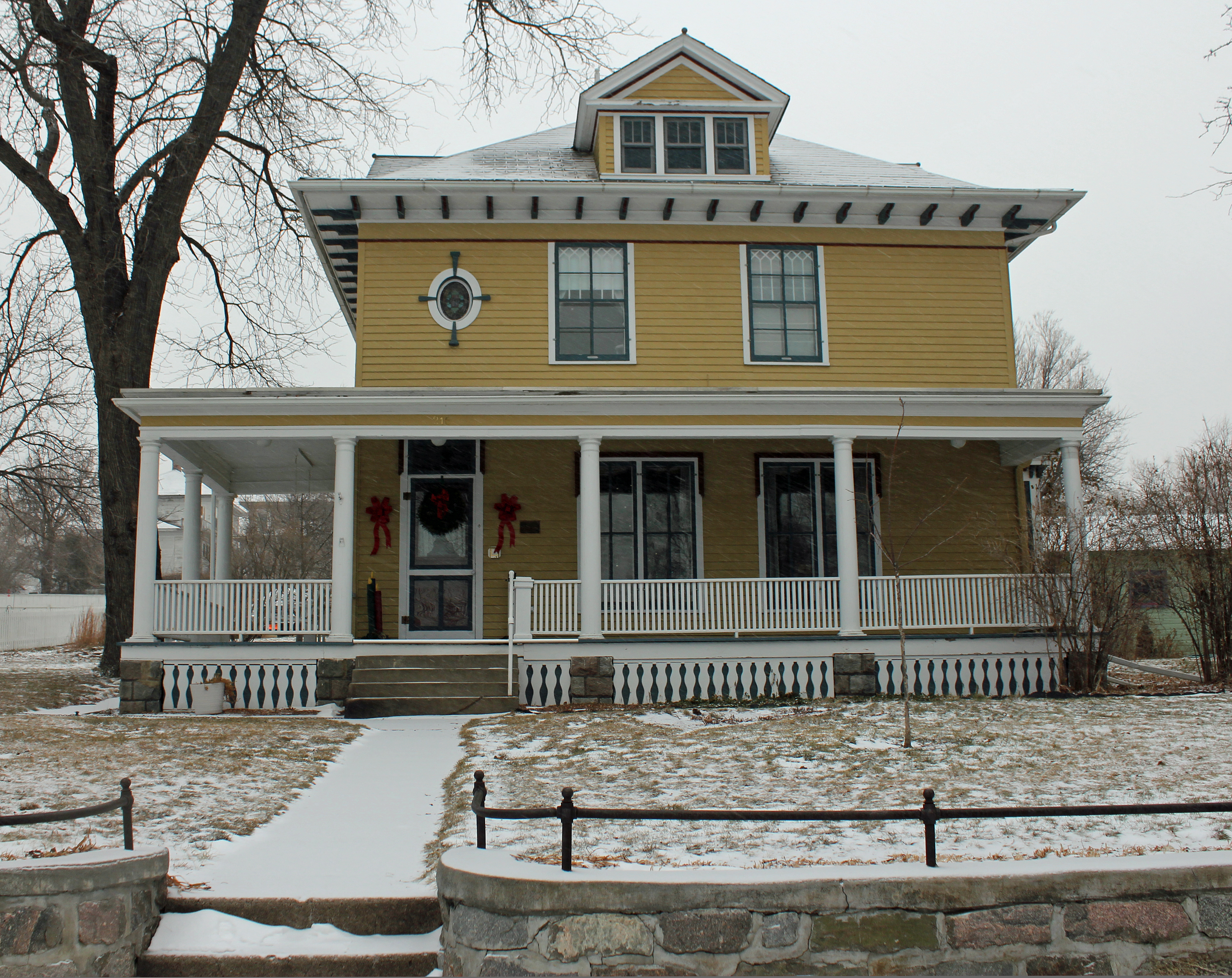

- Location within South Dakota Location within the United States
- Location: 216 E. Prospect Ave., Pierre, South Dakota
- Coordinates: 44°22′44″N 100°20′59″W
- Area: less than one acre
- Architectural style: Colonial Revival
- NRHP reference No.: 95000278
- Added to NRHP: March 23, 1995

The I. W. Goodner House is a historic house located at 216 E. Prospect Avenue in Pierre, South Dakota. The house, one of the oldest in Pierre, was built between 1881 and 1885 for I. W. Goodner, the first clerk of the South Dakota Supreme Court. While the house was built with a Gothic Revival design, Goodner remodeled the house in the 1900s, converting it to a Colonial Revival home. The renovated house featured a new second story and attic and a wraparound porch supported by Tuscan columns.

The house was added to the National Register of Historic Places on March 23, 1995.

== See also ==
- List of the oldest buildings in South Dakota
