= Ohlman-Shannon House =

- U.S. National Register of Historic Places
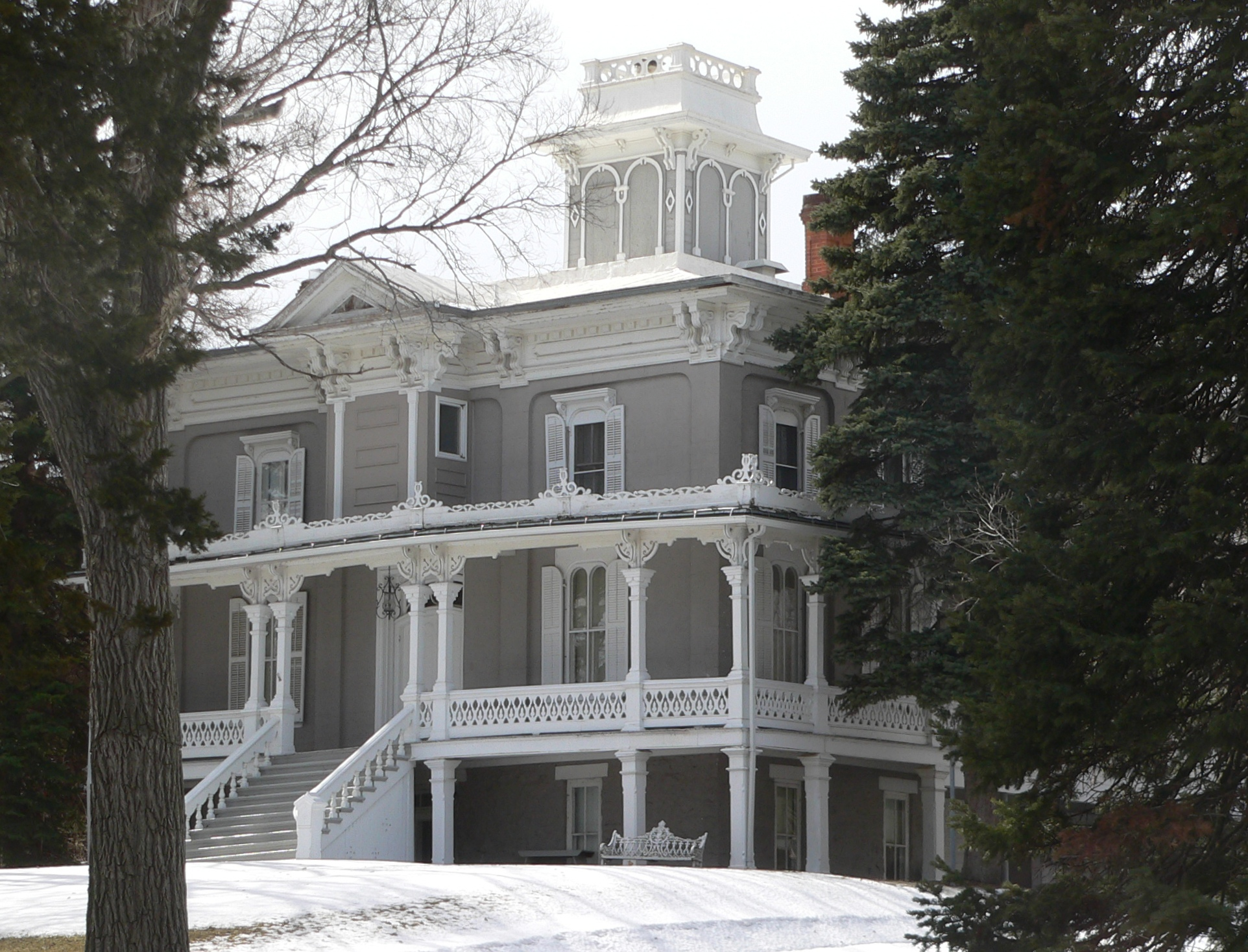
- The house in 2011

- Location within South Dakota Location within the United States
- Location: 205 Green Street, Yankton, South Dakota
- Coordinates: 42°52′11″N 97°24′06″W
- Area: 1.5 acres (0.61 ha)
- Built: 1871
- Architectural style: Italianate
- NRHP reference No.: 76001758
- Added to NRHP: May 28, 1976

The Ohlman-Shannon House is a historic house in Yankton, South Dakota. It was built in 1871 for Charles Mclntyre, who sold it to Martin P. Ohlman, Sr. in 1878. Ohlman was a real estate investor who served as the president of the American National Bank and as a director and treasurer of the Yankton Bridge and Ferry Company. The house remained in the Ohlman family until 1975, when his granddaughter, married to William Shannon, sold it to John Harmelink. It was designed in the Italianate architectural style. It has been listed on the National Register of Historic Places since May 28, 1976.

== See also ==
- List of the oldest buildings in South Dakota
