= St. Peter's Lutheran Church (South Dakota) =

Historic church in South Dakota, United States

- U.S. National Register of Historic Places
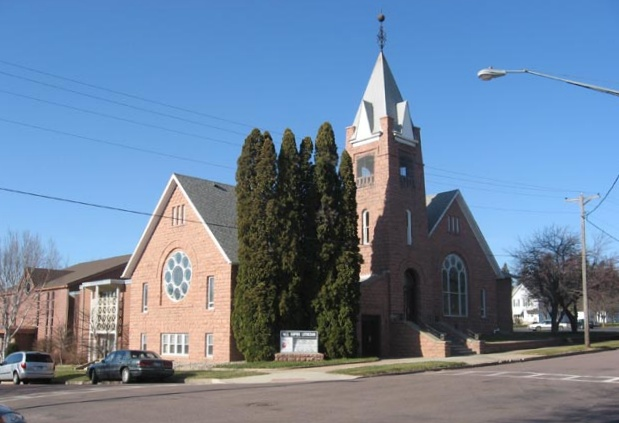

- Location within South Dakota Location within the United States
- Location: 701 North Orleans, Dell Rapids, South Dakota
- Coordinates: 43°49′34″N 96°42′37″W
- Area: less than one acre
- Built: 1902
- Architect: Paulson Brothers
- Architectural style: Romanesque
- NRHP reference No.: 02000018
- Added to NRHP: February 15, 2002

St. Peter's Lutheran Church is a historic church at 701 North Orleans in Dell Rapids, South Dakota. It was added to the National Register in 2002.

St. Peter's congregation was first organized in 1887. The Romanesque Revival style church was built in 1902. The church was constructed of Sioux Quartzite, quarried locally. It was designed and constructed by the Paulson Brothers of Dell Rapids. In the year of 1918 the congregations of Stordahl and St. Peter's Lutheran Churches were combined. It was at this point that the name of the congregation changed to the Lutheran Church in Dell Rapids.
