= Methodist Episcopal Church (Scotland, South Dakota) =

Historic church in South Dakota, United States

- U.S. National Register of Historic Places
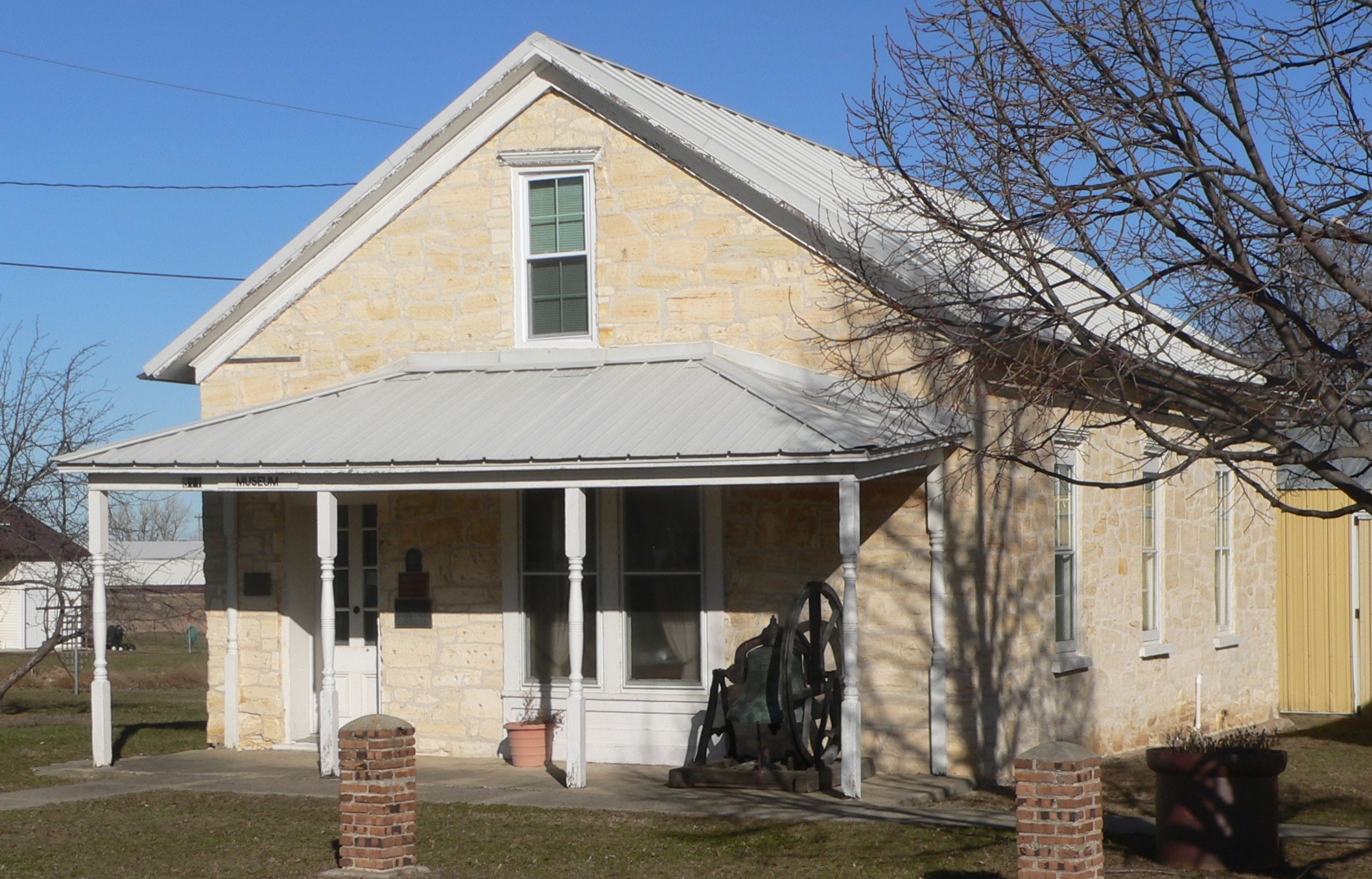

- Location within South Dakota Location within the United States
- Location: 811 6th St., Scotland, South Dakota
- Coordinates: 43.147508°N 97.713206°W
- Built: 1872
- NRHP reference No.: 79002397
- Added to NRHP: September 12, 1979

The Methodist Episcopal Church in Scotland, South Dakota is a former Methodist church located at 811 6th Street. It was built in 1872. In 1979 it was added to the National Register of Historic Places. As of that date, it was the Heritage Museum-Chapel.

It is a one-and-one-half-story building made of native chalkstone quarried one-half mile away. It is about 24 by 36 feet (7.3 m × 11.0 m) in plan.

It is the oldest Methodist Church building in South Dakota. The national Methodist Church lists it as their historic site No. 52.
