= All Saints School (Sioux Falls, South Dakota) =

- All Saints School Main Building
- U.S. National Register of Historic Places
- U.S. Historic district – Contributing property
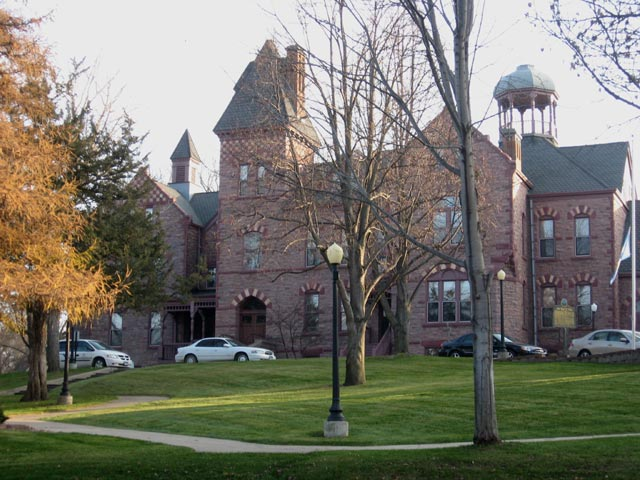

- Location within South Dakota Location within the United States
- Location: 101 West 17th Street, Sioux Falls, South Dakota
- Coordinates: 43°32′14″N 96°43′40″W
- Area: 4 acres (1.6 ha)
- Built: 1884
- Architectural style: Prairie Gothic
- NRHP reference No.: 73001748

Significant dates
- Designated NRHP: March 14, 1973
- Designated CP: February 23, 1984

The All Saints School is a historic private school in Sioux Falls, South Dakota. William Hobart Hare, the first Episcopal bishop of South Dakota, founded the school to serve as a girls' boarding school for the children of Episcopal missionaries. The school's main building, a four-story granite Prairie Gothic structure with a distinctive bell tower, was built in 1884. A cupola sits atop the building's front entrance; Hare's personal quarters was near the cupola, and he was known to watch the city from the cupola in the evening. A 1 1/2-story chapel is located on the west side of the main building.

The school's main building was listed on the National Register of Historic Places in 1973. It is also part of the All Saints Historic District.
