= All Saints Historic District =

Historic district in South Dakota, United States

- U.S. National Register of Historic Places
- U.S. Historic district
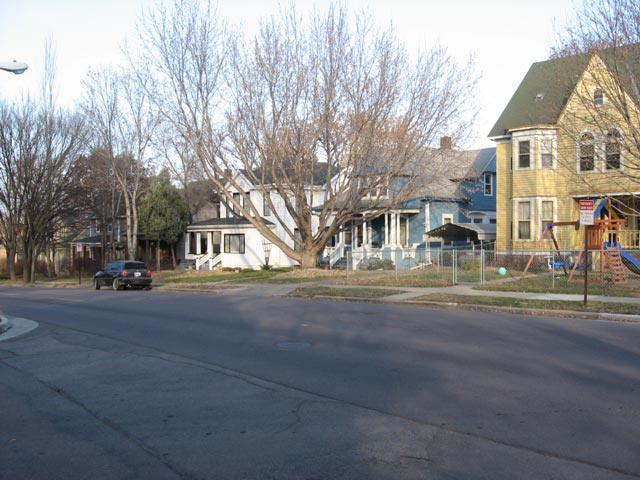
- Houses in All Saints Historic District, 2009
- Interactive map of All Saints Historic District
- Location: Roughly Main to 2nd Avenue from 14th to 23rd Streets, and 18th to 21st Streets to 5th Avenue, Sioux Falls, South Dakota
- Area: 70 acres (28 ha)
- Built: 1880
- Architectural style: Late 19th And 20th Century Revivals, Bungalow/Craftsman
- NRHP reference No.: 84003349
- Added to NRHP: February 23, 1984

All Saints Historic District is a 70-acre (28 ha) area in Sioux Falls, South Dakota. Consisting mainly of over 374 late 19th- and early 20th-century homes, it is named for one of its landmark contributing properties, the All Saints School. It was listed on the National Register of Historic Places in 1984.

== Geography ==
All Saints Historic District encompasses a 70-acre (28 ha) area just south of the Sioux Falls Downtown Historic District. It is roughly bounded by 14th and 23rd Streets to the north and south, respectively; between Main and Phillips Avenues on the west; and between 1st and 2nd Avenues to the east, with an additional eastern portion roughly between 18th and 21st Streets and 5th Avenue.

In total, there are 374 contributing properties (CPs) and 48 non-contributing properties. Of the CPs, all are buildings except one, which is Lyons Park. Of the contributing buildings, 214 are primarily residential buildings, and 159 are outbuildings.

== Landmark properties ==
The district lists 27 landmark properties, or entries which contribute significantly to the historic and architectural significance of the listing. These are:

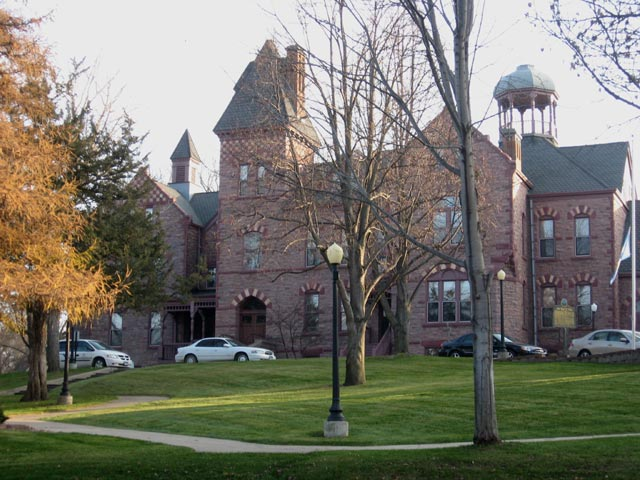
All Saints School, landmark contributing property and the district's namesake

- All Saints School, 101 West 17th Street (built 1884)
- W. L. Baker House, 1301 South Phillips Avenue (built 1890)
- A. Harry Beach House, 201 East 20th Street (built 1924)
- Russell Bell House, 106 East 23rd Street (built 1917)
- Henry Carlson House, 1119 South 3rd Avenue (built 1918)
- Sivert A. Christienson House, 131 West 8th Street (built 1902)
- Charles A. Christopherson House, 1000 South Phillips Avenue (built 1903)
- Edward Coughran House, 1203 South 1st Avenue (built 1887)
- Roger Dennis House, 118 West 19th Street (built 1912)
- Wallace Dow Duplex, 704–706 South 1st Avenue (built 1895)
- Wallace Dow House, 700 South 1st Avenue (built 1885)
- Dunham Hospital Building, 601 South 1st Avenue (built 1900)
- Daniel Glidden Duplex, 1109 South Phillips Avenue (built 1900)
- Cyrus W. Grannis House, 104 East 20th Street (built 1903)
- Arthur B. Hewson House, 804 South Phillips Avenue (built 1915)
- D. Clinton Jewett House, 1309 South Phillips Avenue (built 1916)
- Longfellow School, 1116 South 4th Avenue (built 1916)
- Lyons Park, corner of Phillips Avenue and South 14th Street (established 1928)
- Dennis McKinney House, 701 South Phillips Avenue (built 1912)
- Robert Perkins House, 1114 South 2nd Avenue (built 1912)
- Residences at 715–717 South Phillips Avenue (built 1911)
- Jacob Schaetzel, Jr.–William Lyon House, 746 South Phillips Avenue (built 1881, moved to current site in 1906)
- Thomas Y. Stephenson House, 1201 South 4th Avenue (built 1910)
- Erick Swenson House, 1118 South 1st Avenue (built 1900)
- Edward R. Tornberg House, 110 East 23rd Street (built 1919)
- Edgar Wenzlaff House, 1117 South 3rd Avenue (built 1917)
- Frank T. Williams House, 100 West 21st Street (built 1918)
