= Dr. Steven's House =

- U.S. National Register of Historic Places
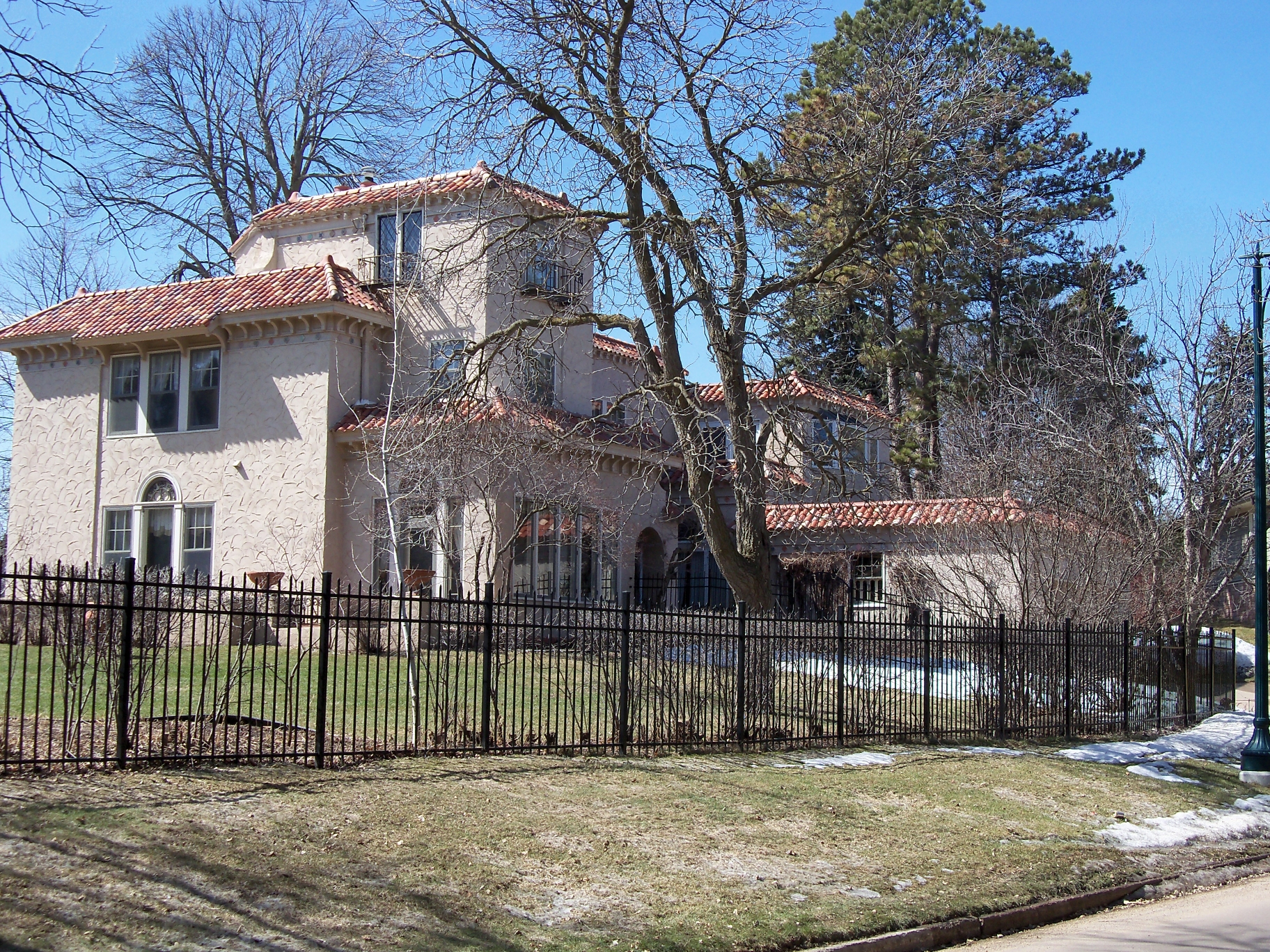
- Dr. Steven's House

- Location within South Dakota Location within the United States
- Nearest city: Sioux Falls, South Dakota
- Coordinates: 43.533056°N 96.7575°W
- Built: 1926
- Architect: Robert Perkins
- Architectural style: Italian Renaissance
- NRHP reference No.: 02001286
- Added to NRHP: October 31, 2002

Dr. Steven's House at 21 S. Riverview Heights in Sioux Falls, South Dakota, was built in 1926 for local physician George Stevens and his wife Nelle. It is located directly facing the Sioux Falls Veteran's Hospital.

The Italian Renaissance architectural style home was designed by local architect Robert Perkins, of Perkins and McWayne. This particular style of architecture was popular in the United States during the late 19th century-early 20th century.

It was listed on the National Register of Historic Places in Minnehaha County, South Dakota in 2002.
