= Orpheum Theater (Sioux Falls) =

Theater in Sioux Falls, South Dakota, US

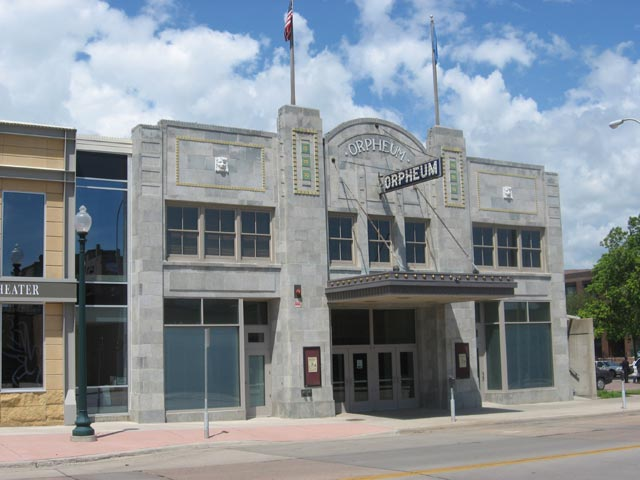
- Interactive map of Orpheum Theater
- Former names: Orpheum Theatre, Sioux Falls Community Playhouse
- Address: 315 North Phillips Avenue; Sioux Falls, South Dakota; USA
- Coordinates: 43°33′2″N 96°43′38.2″W

Construction
- Opened: October 2, 1913

Website
- www.siouxfallsorpheum.com
- Orpheum Theatre
- U.S. National Register of Historic Places
- Area: less than one acre
- Architectural style: Prairie School Adaption, Neoclassical
- NRHP reference No.: 83003016
- Added to NRHP: June 23, 1983

The Orpheum Theater (historically spelled Orpheum Theatre), formerly the Sioux Falls Community Playhouse, is a historic theater at 315 North Phillips Avenue in downtown Sioux Falls, South Dakota, United States. It is the oldest theater in Sioux Falls and was listed on the National Register of Historic Places in 1983. Originally, it hosted vaudeville performances, and briefly served as a movie theater before being converted again into a stage theater, which it remains today.

== History ==
=== Establishment and vaudeville ===
The Orpheum Theatre was founded by Frank and Lawrence Solari (operating as the Solari Brothers). It was built over a period of several weeks in 1913 for a total price of $63,200 and officially opened on October 2 of that year. (Note: The National Register of Historic Places nomination form gives the date as October 6; however, several newspaper advertisements and articles before and after the opening support the actual date as October 2.) The theater mainly booked vaudeville acts during this period, most of which came in from Chicago or New York City. Notable performers at the Orpheum included Jack Benny; Stan Laurel; Edgar Bergen; Eddie Foy Sr. and his children, the Seven Little Foys; and Phil Baker. A railroad spur was built to the backdoor of the auditorium that allowed performing companies to transport heavy equipment, props, and animals. In 1919, the Orpheum Theatre was sold to the theatre management company Finklestein and Reuben, who employed the Minneapolis-based Liebenberg and Kaplan architectural firm to work on renovations. At this time, various businesses occupied the flanking wings on either side of the theater's main entrance, and the top level served as apartments.

In 1927, the Orpheum was purchased by Minnesota Amusement Company and was converted into a movie theater, which had become increasingly popular by that time. However, movies could not sustain the theater, and attendance at the Orpheum waned. The building gradually became unused and sat abandoned for decades.

=== Sioux Falls Community Playhouse ===
In 1954, the Sioux Falls Community Playhouse purchased and renovated the property, and it has been used as a stage theater since. Teen Theatre and Children's Theatre programs were arranged in 1961, later merging into the Young People's Theatre program. Further renovations were carried out in 1975 by Spitznagel Partners of Sioux Falls; this also descreased the available audience seating to 692. On June 23, 1983, it was listed on the National Register of Historic Places for its status as the oldest surviving theater in Sioux Falls, as well as its well-preserved architectural design.

In 1994, the Sioux Falls Community Center purchased the King of Clubs building at 319 North Phillips, two plots to the south of the Orpheum, and renamed it the Anne Zabel Actor's Studio. The former King of Clubs building had been built in 1949 and had hosted a variety of businesses, most notably a club, but over the years also hosted a liquor store, flooring store, a tailor, travel agent, and several bars. They intended to join that building to the Orpheum with the "Link to the Future", creating one large theater complex spanning the block; construction began in 1995. The Link, however, proved much more expensive to construct than the playhouse had anticipated, and the Sioux Falls Community Playhouse suffered financially. In 2000, the City of Sioux Falls purchased the Actor's Studio, the Orpheum Theater for $475,000, and the unfinished Link for $275,000 to prevent the complex from having to sell its furnishings and close. The Sioux Falls Community Playhouse organization still closed on April 30, 2002. In 2003, a few remaining Sioux Falls Community Playhouse members restarted the local community theatre group as the Sioux Empire Community Theatre Inc. and in 2021 rebranded as to The Premiere Playhouse.The Premiere Playhouse currently has offices in the Orpheum Theater Center and produces 4-8 productions a year on the Orpheum Theater's historic stage. As of 2026, the premiere Playhouse has moved out of the Orpheum Theater and their offices are currently located in the Rock Island building across the street.

The theater itself remained open and operational in the city's name, allowing outside groups to rent the theater for their shows. In 2005, the city announced it would set aside nearly $1.1 million for its renovations to begin the following year. SMG was contracted to manage the theater at that time. On July 1, 2019, Washington Pavilion Management Inc. took over management; the company is so named for the nearby Washington Pavilion of Arts and Science, which it also oversees.

== Architecture ==
The Orpheum Theater is crafted in a blend of Neoclassical and Prairie School architectural styles, with its symmetrical, clean lines and geometric ornamentation. The front of the building is covered in light gray terra cotta blocks cut to resemble marble. It is two stories tall, with one added story above the backstage. It has a recessed front entrance sheltered by a metal marquee and two large flanking wings with plate glass windows on either side. Two large pillars rise far above the building's flat roofline and divide the front into three bays; three double-hung windows sit inside the second story of each of these bays. Large letters reading "Orpheum" are arranged in a semi-circle at the building's cornice, directly above the front entrance. Stucco was added to the side and rear walls in 1975. An addition measuring 30 by 50 feet (9.1 by 15.2 m) was constructed adjacent to the alley behind the building in 1978.

At its opening, the Orpheum Theater advertised 1,000 seats in its main floor and balcony, and also stressed its fireproofing measures. Today, the theater seats 686. The main lobby was originally decorated with oil paintings. The marble walls and tile floors survive today. Two ticket booths were positioned on either side of the entrance, and a restroom was located further inside. Under the main stage were seven dressing rooms for performers to use. Four of the six intricate murals that were painted on the friezes and ceilings had survived decades of neglect; two others were restored in 2009 by the Minneapolis-based Midwest Art Conservation Center. Later remodels added new heating and sprinkler systems, restrooms, and a fire curtain. The stairways and lobby have also been renovated.
