= Brandon Township, Minnehaha County, South Dakota =

Township in Minnehaha County, South Dakota

Coordinates: 43°38′05″N 96°35′37″W

Brandon Township is a township in Minnehaha County, in the U.S. state of South Dakota.

== History ==
Brandon Township was named after Brandon, Vermont.
