= South Side Fire Station No. 3 =

- U.S. National Register of Historic Places
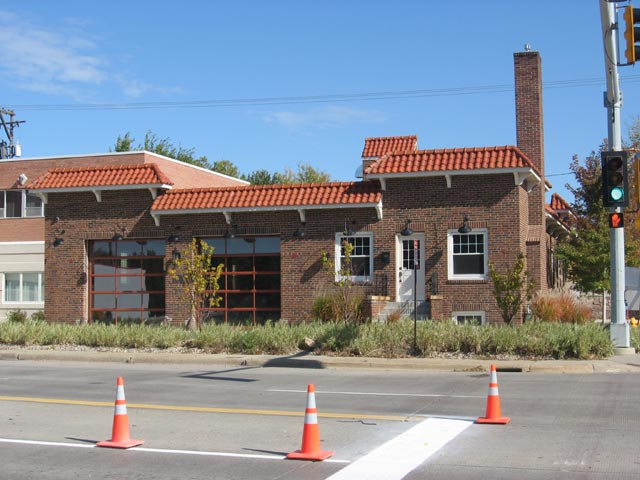

- Location within South Dakota Location within the United States
- Location: 1324 S. Minnesota Ave., Sioux Falls, South Dakota
- Coordinates: 43°32′00″N 96°43′51″W
- Area: less than one acre
- Built: c. 1931
- Built by: John Schilt Construction Co.
- NRHP reference No.: 84003369
- Added to NRHP: February 23, 1984

South Side Fire Station No. 3, at 1324 S. Minnesota Ave. in Sioux Falls, South Dakota, was built in 1931. It was listed on the National Register of Historic Places in 1984.

It is a one-story red brick building, built around 1931 for the National Youth Administration. It became a fire station in 1945. It was sold by the city in 1964 and became a coffee house. In 1983 it was home of the Bernice Johnson School of Modeling.
