= Queen Bee Mill =

- U.S. National Register of Historic Places
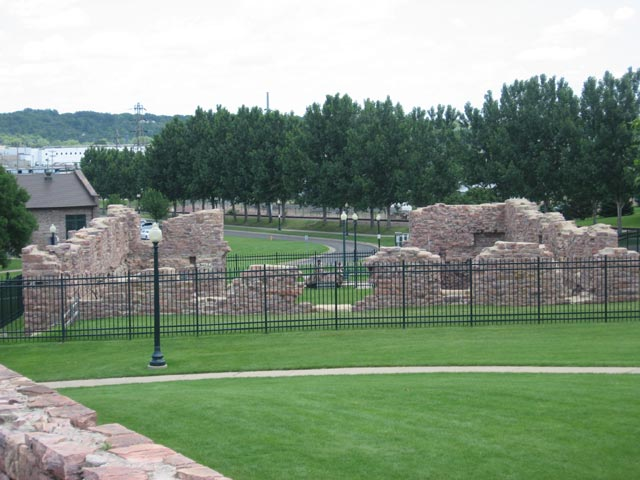
- The mill's foundation

- Location within South Dakota Location within the United States
- Location: N. Weber Ave., Falls Park, Sioux Falls, South Dakota
- Coordinates: 43°33′25″N 96°43′19″W
- Area: 2 acres (0.81 ha)
- Built: 1881
- Architect: McKeen, J. W.
- NRHP reference No.: 84003362
- Added to NRHP: August 1, 1984

The Queen Bee Mill is a ruined mill complex located in Falls Park in Sioux Falls, South Dakota. Opened in 1881, the mill operated intermittently for several different owners during the late nineteenth and early twentieth centuries. A 1956 fire led to the site's demolition, leaving the ruins that stand today. The mill site is listed on the National Register of Historic Places.

== History ==
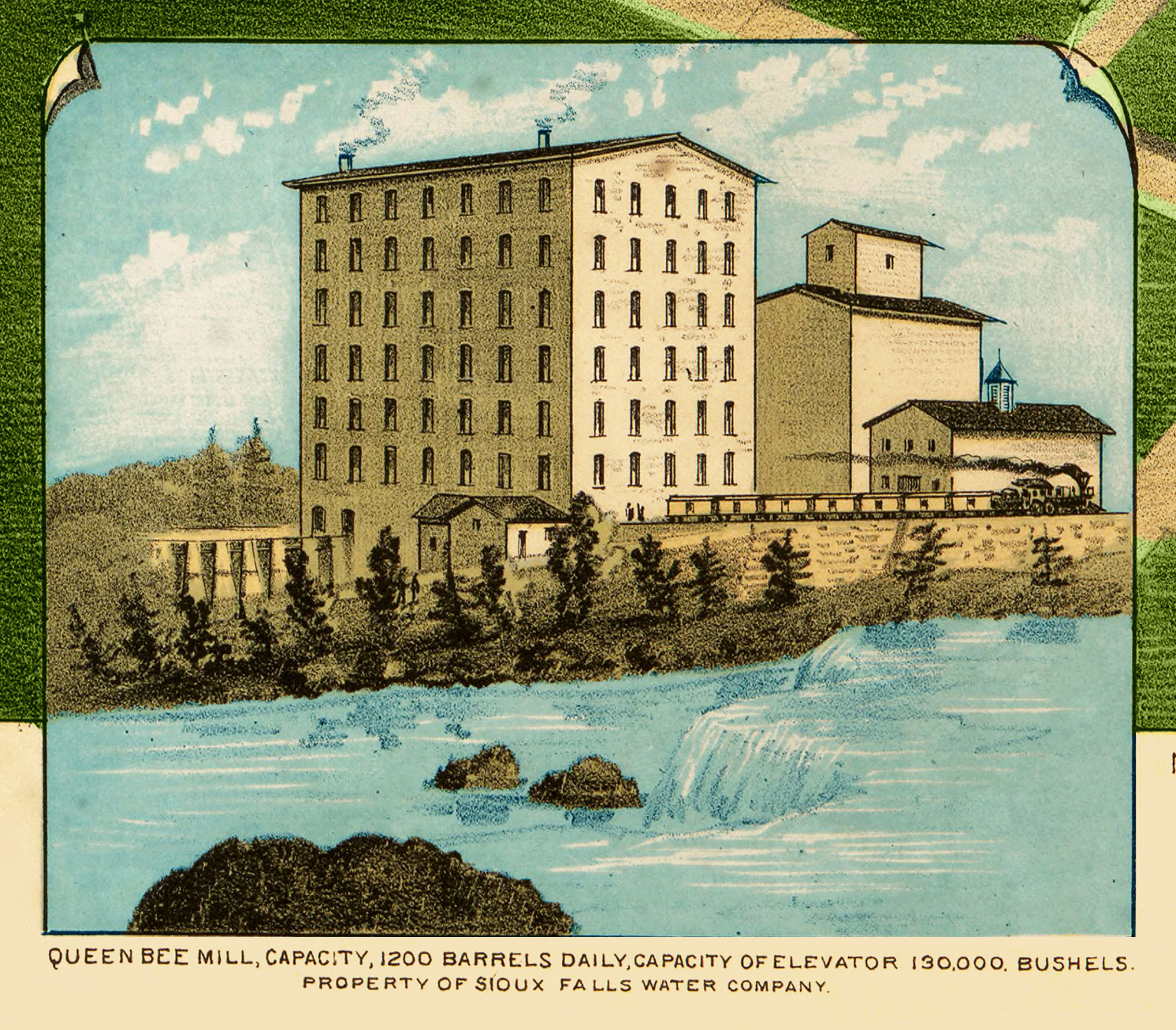
Queen Bee Mill in 1881

The mill was built between 1879 and 1881 under the guidance of politician Richard F. Pettigrew, who believed that Sioux Falls could harness the power of the Big Sioux River for local industry. When it opened on October 25, 1881, the mill could process 1200 barrels of grain per day, and its elevator could hold 130,000 bushels; it also had connections to all five of the city's rail lines through a spur of the Chicago, St. Paul, Minneapolis and Omaha Railway. Despite the mill's high capacity, it suffered from weaker than expected water power and a poor supply of wheat, and it was financially unsuccessful. It closed on April 20, 1883, less than two years after it opened, and its operators went bankrupt.

The mill sat vacant until 1911, when the United Flour Mills Company of Minneapolis bought the site. United Flour Mills operated the mill until 1916 or 1918 and were responsible for electrifying the complex. After they ended regular operations at the mill, the Commander-Larabee Company used it occasionally through 1929. The property was converted to warehouse space in 1937, and it remained in use as such until 1956.

A fire destroyed the complex in 1956, and its remains were demolished in 1961. The foundations of the mill and grain elevator are all that remain at the site.

The mill was added to the National Register of Historic Places on August 1, 1984.

== Facilities ==
When it opened, the mill complex included four buildings: the mill itself, a grain elevator, a warehouse, and a cooper's workshop. The mill stood seven stories high with a footprint of 80 by 100 feet (24 m × 30 m). The elevator was shorter than the mill at four stories high, and it measured 142 by 50 feet (43 m × 15 m) at its base. All four buildings were constructed from quartzite quarried at the building site. The complex also included a dam, mill race, and turbine to supply power to the mill. The entire mill cost roughly $500,000 to build.
