= St. Lawrence O'Toole Catholic Church =

Historic church in South Dakota, United States

- U.S. National Register of Historic Places
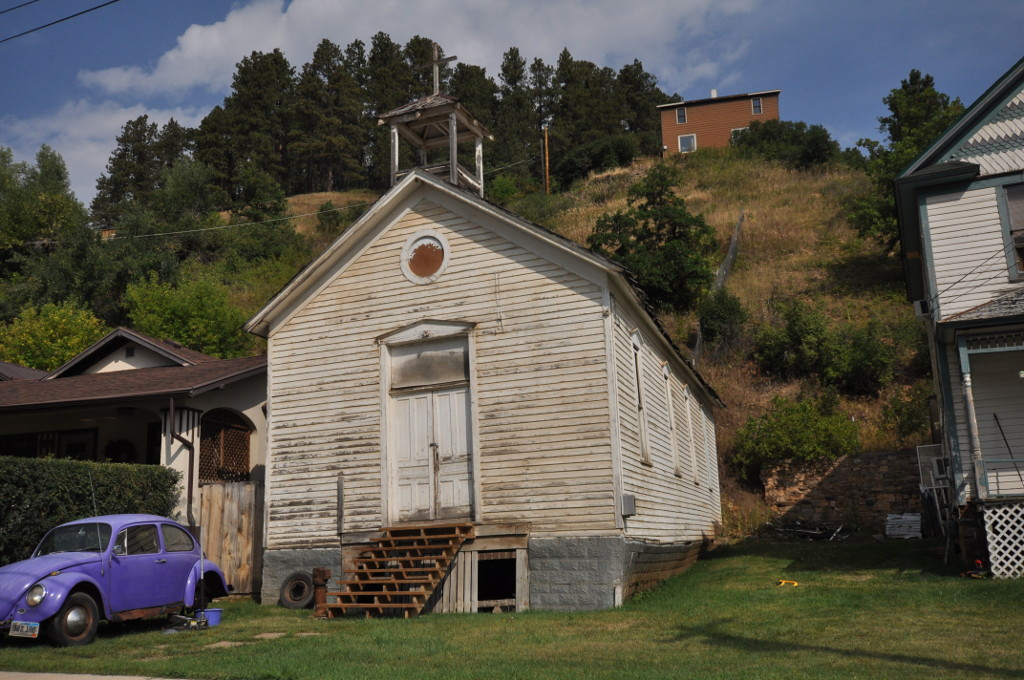

- Location within South Dakota Location within the United States
- Location: 618 Main, Central City, South Dakota
- Coordinates: 44°22′10″N 103°45′58″W
- Area: less than one acre
- Built: 1879
- NRHP reference No.: 02001764
- Added to NRHP: February 5, 2003

St. Lawrence O'Toole Catholic Church is a historic former Catholic church at 618 Main in Central City, South Dakota. Built in 1879, it is a one-story frame, vernacular style building with a gable roof. It was added to the National Register of Historic Places in 2003.

Originally built in Central City's business district, it now lies in a residential neighborhood. In 2007 its neighbors purchased it, originally intending to demolish it. Upon learning it was a historic structure, they instead have been working to restore it, using grants from Deadwood Historic Preservation to the municipal government.
