= Brown Earth Presbyterian Church =

Historic building in South Dakota, US

- U.S. National Register of Historic Places
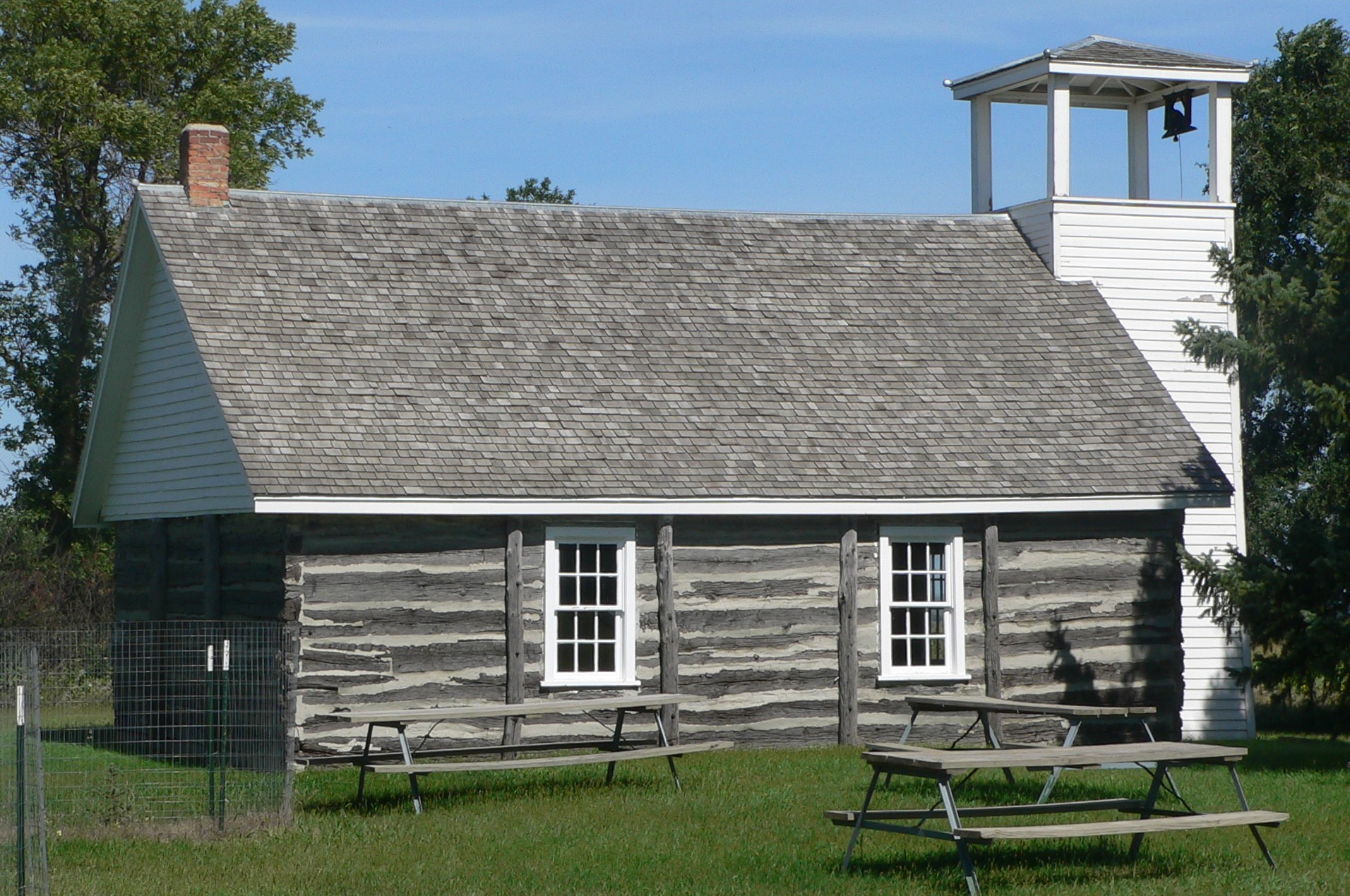

- Location within South Dakota Location within the United States
- Nearest city: Stockholm, South Dakota
- Coordinates: 45.122156°N 96.772113°W
- Built: 1877
- NRHP reference No.: 84003288
- Added to NRHP: August 29, 1984

Brown Earth Presbyterian Church (also known as Old Indian Church) is a church building in Grant County, South Dakota. It was built in 1877, and was added to the National Register of Historic Places in 1984.

It is located approximately one mile (1.6 km) northeast of Stockholm, South Dakota. It is a log building, built of hand-hewn logs with dovetail notching, which is about 20 by 25 feet (6.1 m × 7.6 m) in plan.
