= Renner Lutheran Church =

Historic church in South Dakota, United States

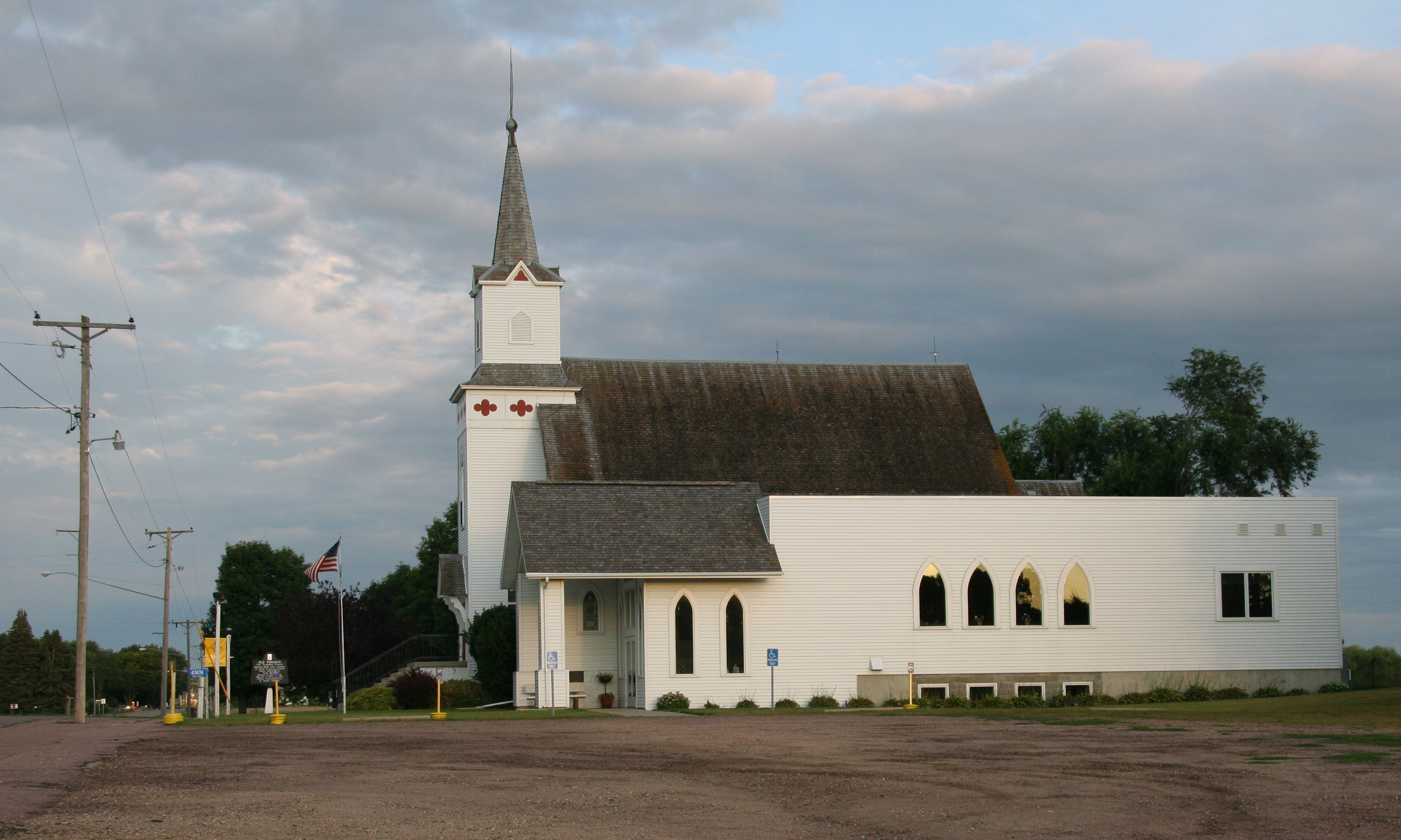
- The church in 2011, seen from the east
- Renner Lutheran Church
- Country: United States
- Denomination: ECLA
- Website: www.rennerlutheran.com

History
- Founded: 1868

Architecture
- Years built: 1878
- Renner Lutheran Sanctuary
- U.S. National Register of Historic Places
- NRHP reference No.: 80003729
- Added to NRHP: May 7, 1980

Renner Lutheran Church, also known as Nidaros Norwegian Evangelical Lutheran Church, is a historic church located in Renner, South Dakota. The church is listed on the National Register of Historic Places as Renner Lutheran Sanctuary. It is reportedly the oldest church in operation in South Dakota.

== History ==
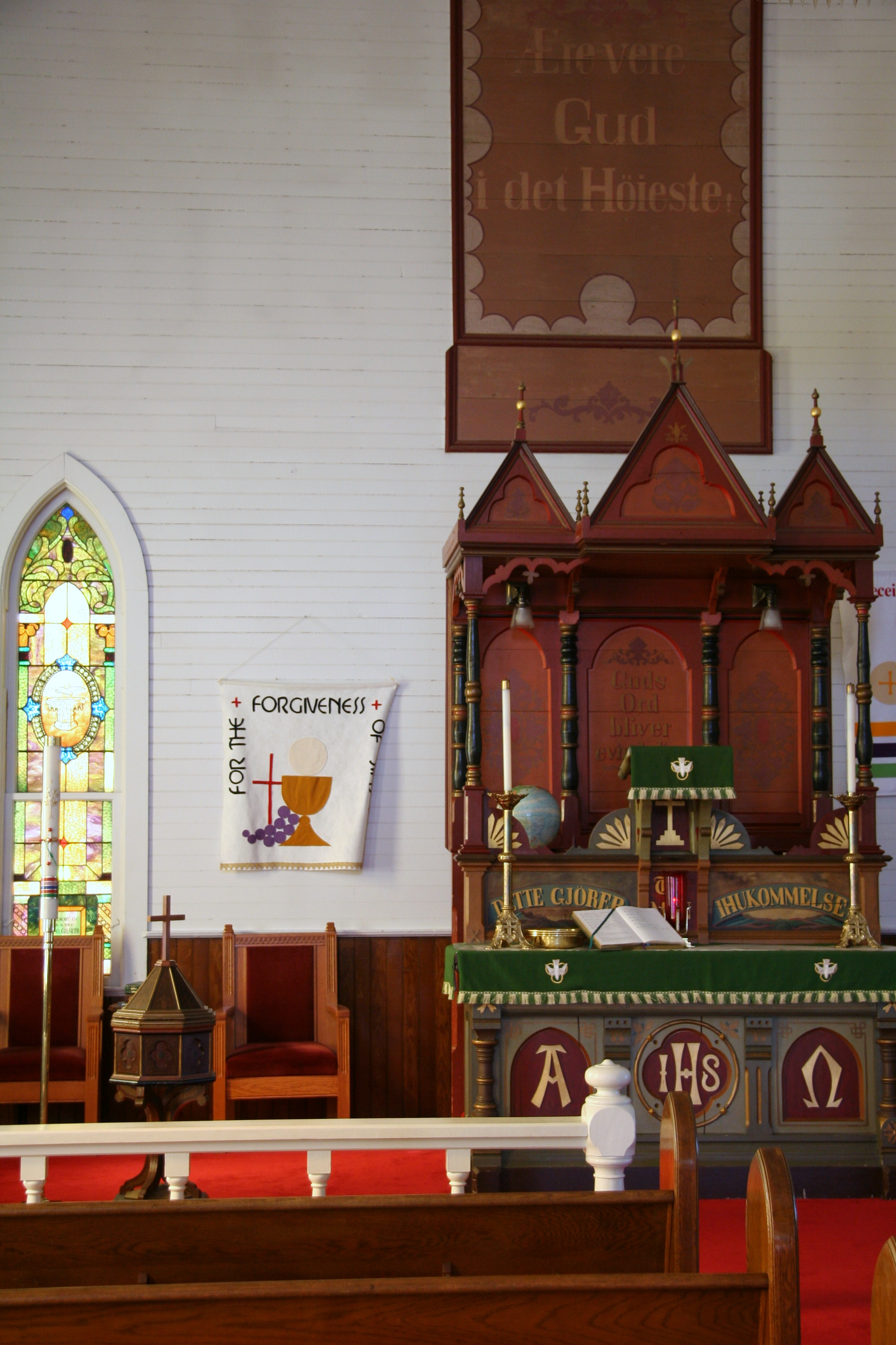
Front of the sanctuary, including the handcrafted altar built in 1886

The church was founded as Nidaros Church in 1868. First located in the sod home Norwegian immigrants John and Kirsti Thompson, a church was later built on the prairie roughly 3 miles (4.8 km) south of Baltic, South Dakota. That church was later destroyed in a wind storm, and rebuilt in 1878. The original church's 100 foot steeple was believed to be the cause of its destruction, so a shorter steeple was selected during reconstruction. Additional churches were also constructed in the region to accommodate churchgoers, since frequent flooding along the Big Sioux River made travel difficult.

The church was moved to Baltic around 1911 or 1912, since the town had no church of its own at the time. It was moved a second time in 1939 to Renner, South Dakota, where it stands today. The church has been in continuous operation for more than 125 years, and is considered the oldest operational church in the state of South Dakota. It is part of the Evangelical Lutheran Church in America denomination. The church's altar was constructed in 1886, and remains a central fixture in the sanctuary.

The church was renamed Renner Lutheran Church in 2009, to avoid confusion with the East and West Nidaros churches that were also part of the congregation.

== See also ==
- List of the oldest churches in the United States
- List of the oldest buildings in South Dakota
