= Terrace Park (Sioux Falls, South Dakota) =

Park in South Dakota, United States

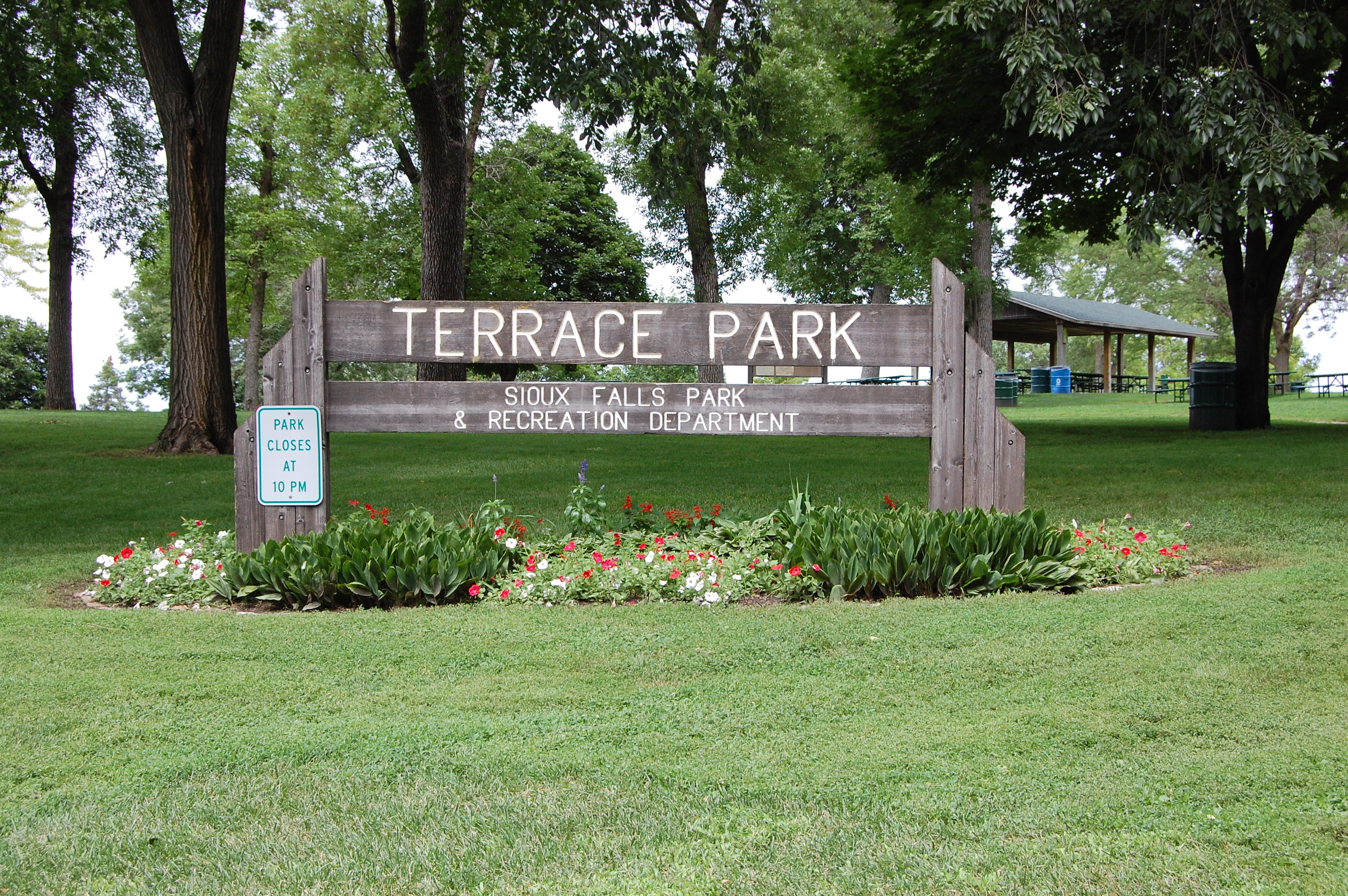
- Sign at entrance to Terrace Park

- Location within South Dakota Location within the United States
- Location: 1100 West 4th Street; Sioux Falls, South Dakota
- Coordinates: 43°33′15″N 96°44′30″W
- Area: 52 acres (21 ha)
- Created: 1916
- Operator: City of Sioux Falls
- Website: Official website
- Terrace Park and Japanese Gardens
- U.S. National Register of Historic Places
- U.S. Historic district
- Area: 11.3 acres (4.6 ha)
- Architect: Charles Ramsdell, Joseph Maddox
- NRHP reference No.: 15000566
- Added to NRHP: September 1, 2015

Terrace Park, historically known as Covell Lake Park or Phillips Park, is a 52-acre (21 ha) public park on the shores of Covell Lake in Sioux Falls, South Dakota. Founded in 1916, its modern name is derived from its steep terraces. It was listed on the National Register of Historic Places as Terrace Park and Japanese Gardens in 2015.

== Layout and facilities ==
Terrace Park spans across 52 acres (21 ha) and encompasses most of Covell Lake, an oxbow lake formed from a cut-off branch of the Big Sioux River. Walking and cycling paths traverse the park and encircle the lake. The most prominent landscaping feature of the park's grounds is its terraces, lined with Sioux quartzite and interspersed with staircases of the same material. These terraces drop some 30 feet (9.1 m) from the top level of the park down to the lakeshore and average about 16 feet (4.9 m) wide.

Terrace Park includes multiple picnic shelters and benches, several restroom buildings, a bandshell, playgrounds, an open-air outdoor theater, a swimming complex, tennis and basketball courts, baseball fields, and a wedding venue. Covell Lake provides fishing spots, canoeing, and kayaking. A circular 20-acre (8.1 ha) veteran's memorial plaza featuring fountains, flagpoles, and star-shaped benches was added to the north end of the park in the early 2000s.

The Japanese garden on the eastern side of Covell Lake includes trees and other vegetation from Japan and the local Great Plains region. Some species featured include Black Hills spruce, honeysuckle, silverweeds, cranberries, hydrangeas, and cherry trees. The garden also features stone walls crafted of local Sioux quartzite that expand on the existing terraces, urns made of stone from the Bighorn Mountains, and decorative stones taken from a stream near Buffalo Bill's grave in Wyoming. Other decorations include wooden pergolas and pagodas, stone lanterns and archways, a stone teahouse, waterfalls, and wooden bridges over small stone-lined pools.

== History ==
During the late 1800s, the land that became Terrace Park had belonged to Dr. Josiah L. Phillips. Born in Maine, Phillips moved to the area in 1857 and settled in Sioux Falls in 1869. In 1882, the Phillips family began construction on a three-story Second Empire style mansion built from local Sioux quartzite and brick; However, Josiah died later that year, and Harriet oversaw the house's completion the following year. As Harriet aged and her finances waned, she declared divestment on the property in 1909 following a fire that heavily damaged the mansion. By 1915, a relative, Waldo Sherman, had contacted his uncle Edwin Sherman, parks director for the City of Sioux Falls. Waldo proposed selling the former Phillips estate to the city to be turned into a public park, and Harriet agreed. The City of Sioux Falls bought the 52-acre (21 ha) property for $15,000 in 1916, although light works did not begin until 1917. The city allocated an additional $10,000 to be used on future works. The first architectural plans were submitted by Charles Ramsdell, a Minnesotan architect who envisioned a terraced landscape, with levels cascading down to the shores of Covell Lake. Most of the outbuildings on the former estate were demolished; however, the house and barn were spared. The barn was turned into temporary horse stables for staff use but later was also demolished. The old Phillips mansion was renovated by 1920 and initially became a fixture of social life, being used by local organizations to host events and as a public mini-museum. Only years later, the house had been largely abandoned for public use and was only used for storage. By the 1950s, the house was in severe disrepair—among the most serious damages were the warped floors and collapsed roof—and the City of Sioux Falls decided saving it would be too costly. The old Phillips mansion was demolished in September 1966, leaving behind only the adjoining carriage house.

The major period of construction took place between 1922 and 1937. The first terraces were built in that first year along the south side of the park, running in a 400-foot (120 m) arc around a new performance stage, the Terrace Park Theater. This first structure was made of wood, and the permanent open-air Mediterranean-style fixture that still stands today was added in 1932. Although early names of the park included Covell Lake Park and Phillips Park, after the completion of the terraces, it was unanimously known as Terrace Park by 1924. Other features added during this early construction were flower gardens along the lakeshore, tennis courts, a playground, a plant nursery, and picnic benches. Municipal funds were scarce during the Great Depression but the Works Progress Administration and private organizations continued to build features at the park. The American Legion added a set of baseball diamonds. The WPA improved park drainage and added new paths and retaining walls.

A small zoo displaying local animals—including bison, coyotes, and elk—was briefly added during the 1920s, but the terrain was soon deemed insufficient for grazing so the animals were removed. However, the park still housed animals on a rolling basis, particularly during the winter months, until the Great Plains Zoo was established in nearby Sherman Park in 1963. During the 1950s up until 1963, monkeys and lions were kept over the winter in the 1884 Phillips estate carriage house, which earned the building the nickname the "Lion's Den". It still stands today and is the last remaining building from the Phillips estate era.

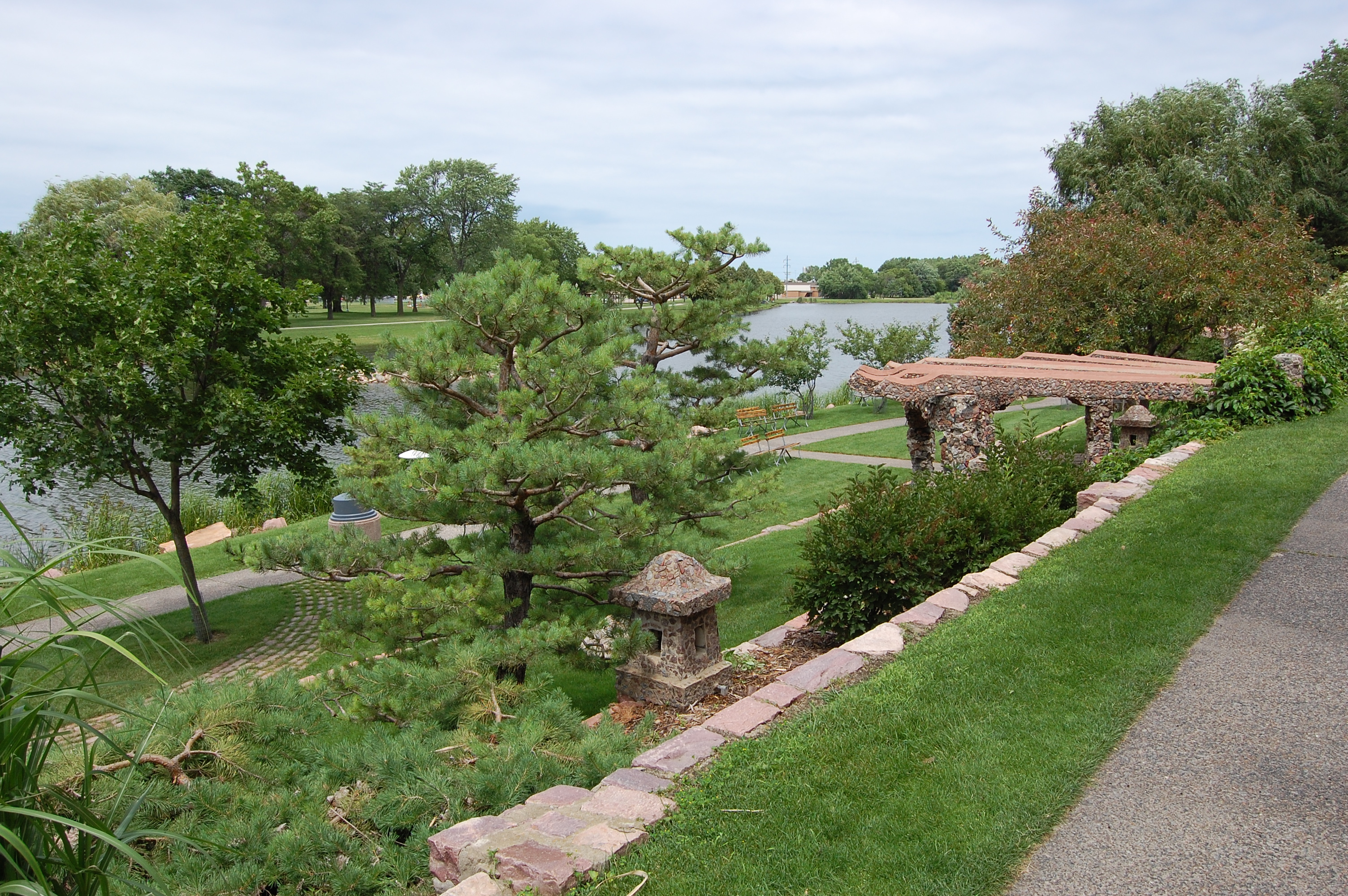
Overlooking the Japanese garden.

The Japanese garden was one of the earliest fixtures in the park. The first park caretaker Joseph Maddox, who had studied Japanese gardens that were becoming popular across the United States, drew up plans to add one to the eastern side of Terrace Park. The first ground broke on the gardens in 1928 and they were expanded through 1932, largely with the help of the Works Progress Administration. Better Homes & Gardens awarded the garden with its 1934 "More Beautiful America" award. At the outbreak of World War II, increased anti-Japanese sentiments led to vandalism to the gardens; the city attempted to rename them to the Oriental Gardens or Chinese Gardens, but neither name stuck. This combined with resources being diverted elsewhere caused the gardens to become neglected and overgrown until the 1960s, when the long-broken waterfalls and walls were repaired and some vegetation was replanted. The gardens were far from repaired, however, until a landscaping team arrived in 1986, funded by the local organization Shoto-Teien. The new improvements were carried out between 1988 and 1991 and were aided in part by labor from inmates from the South Dakota State Penitentiary. A black chain-link fence was built around the perimeter of the garden in 2004 to reduce vandalism; the previous summer, vandals had destroyed a redwood pagoda valued at $10,000.

Swimming beaches were added to the lakeside in 1931. During World War II, the nearby Army Air Force Radio Technical Training School built a concrete pool on the east side of the park, and after the war ended it was added to Terrace Park for public use; this pool was replaced by a larger complex in 1994. Ice skating events were frequently held on Covell Lake during the winter and continued on the ice rink until 1996. Paddleboats were available for rental on the lake from 1956 until the 1990s.

The 11.3-acre (4.6 ha) historic core of Terrace Park containing the Japanese garden was listed on the National Register of Historic Places on September 1, 2015, for its local and architectural significance, as well as for its association with the Works Progress Administration and other New Deal programs. The city created plans to renovated the park for its 2016 centennial, adding new pathways, replacing some of the older structures, and performing maintenance on the Lion's Den. However, plans that would have removed some of the historic quartzite pathways were canceled after opposition from local community groups.
