= Falls Park =

Public park in Sioux Falls, South Dakota, U.S.

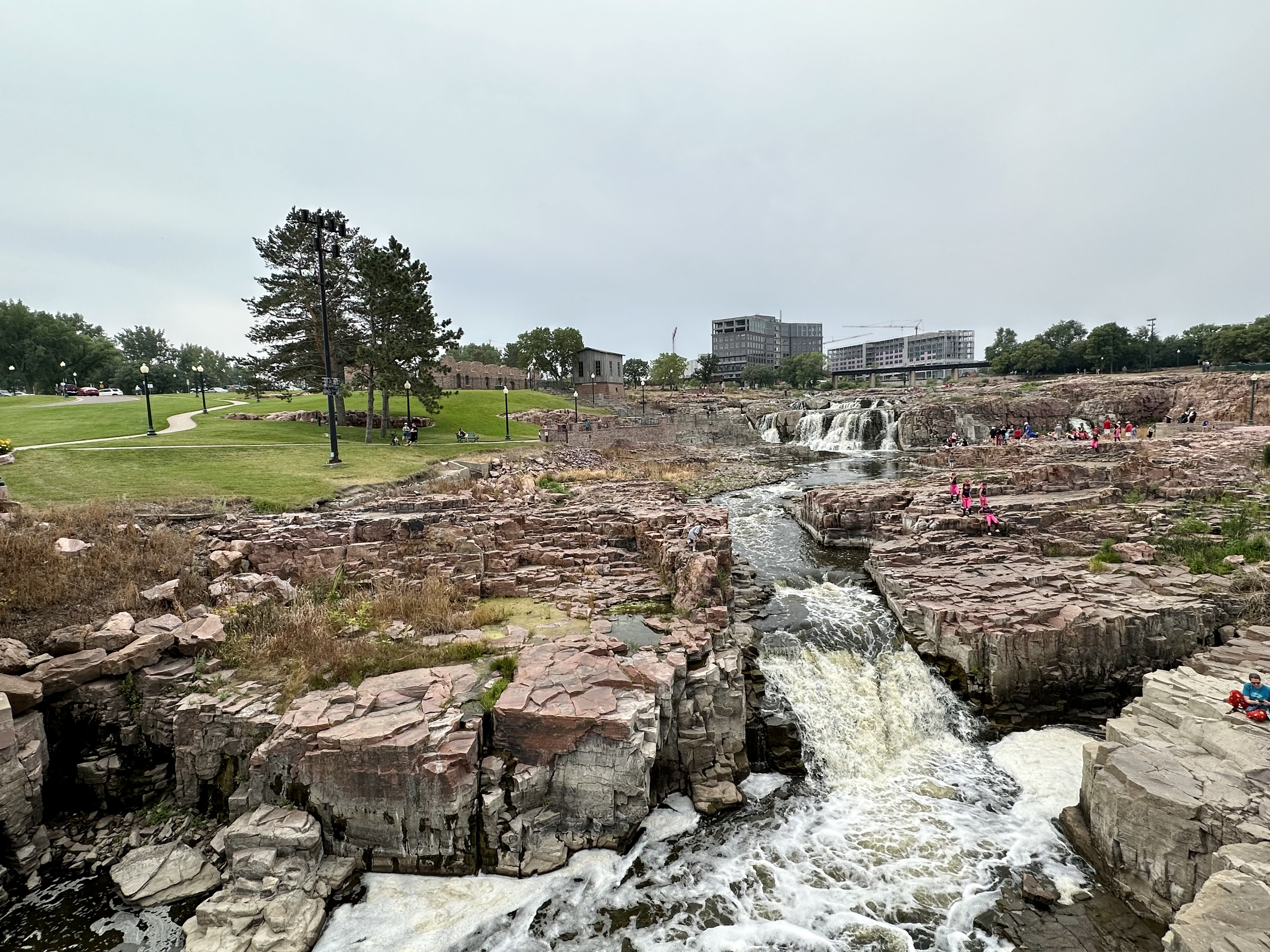
- Falls Park, Sioux Falls, South Dakota

- Location within South Dakota
- Location: Minnehaha County, South Dakota, United States
- Coordinates: 43.556844°N 96.721931°W
- Area: 123 acres (50 ha)
- Governing body: City of Sioux Falls

Falls Park is a public park in north central Sioux Falls, South Dakota, surrounding the city's waterfalls. The park includes a cafe, an observation tower, and the remains of an old mill.

The park comprises over 128 acres just north of downtown, along the Big Sioux River. An average of 7,400 gallons of water fall 100 feet per second. There are some viewing platforms, including the five-story observation tower. Falls Park includes some of Sioux Falls' oldest buildings.

== Buildings ==
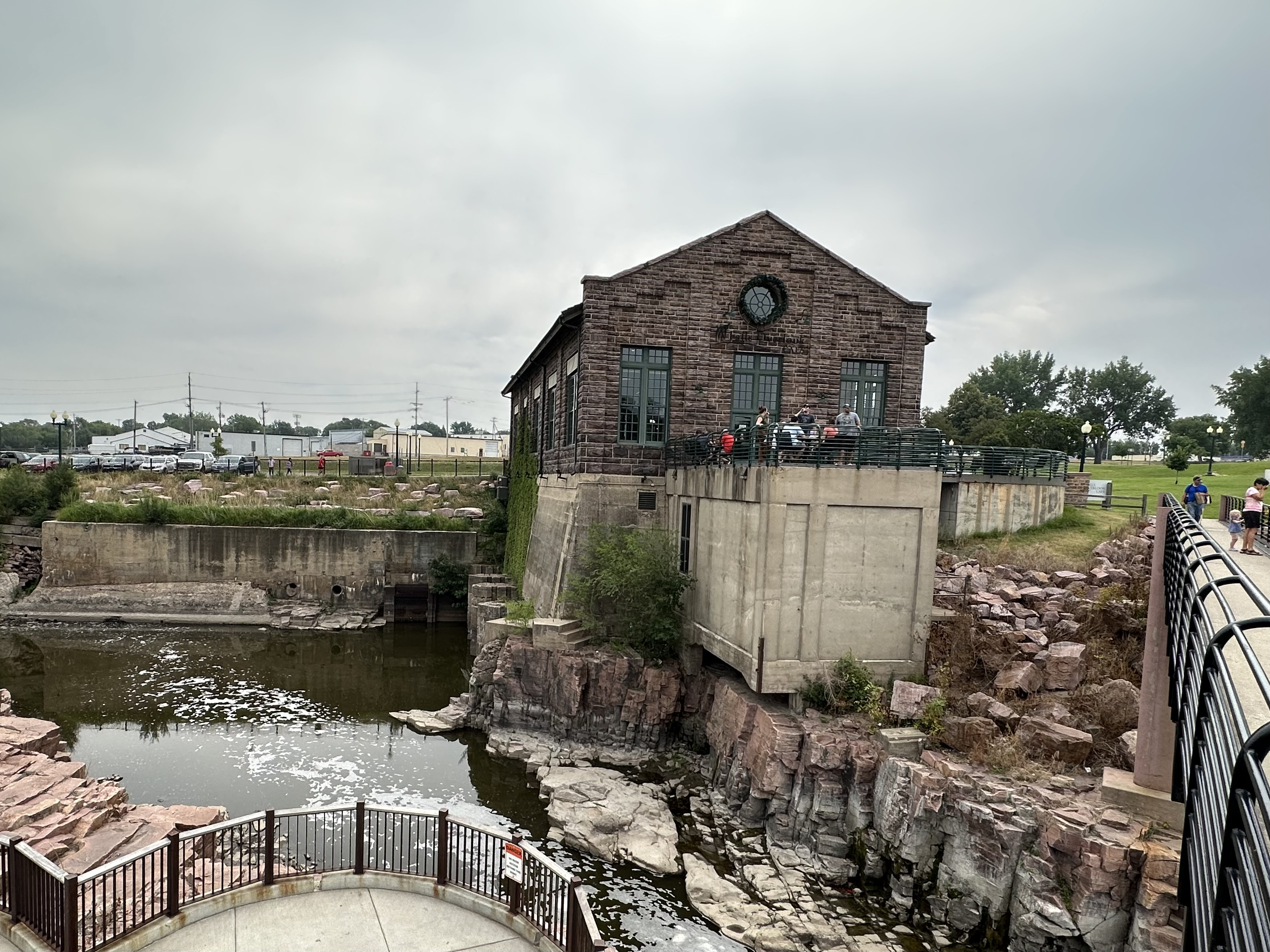
Falls Overlook Cafe

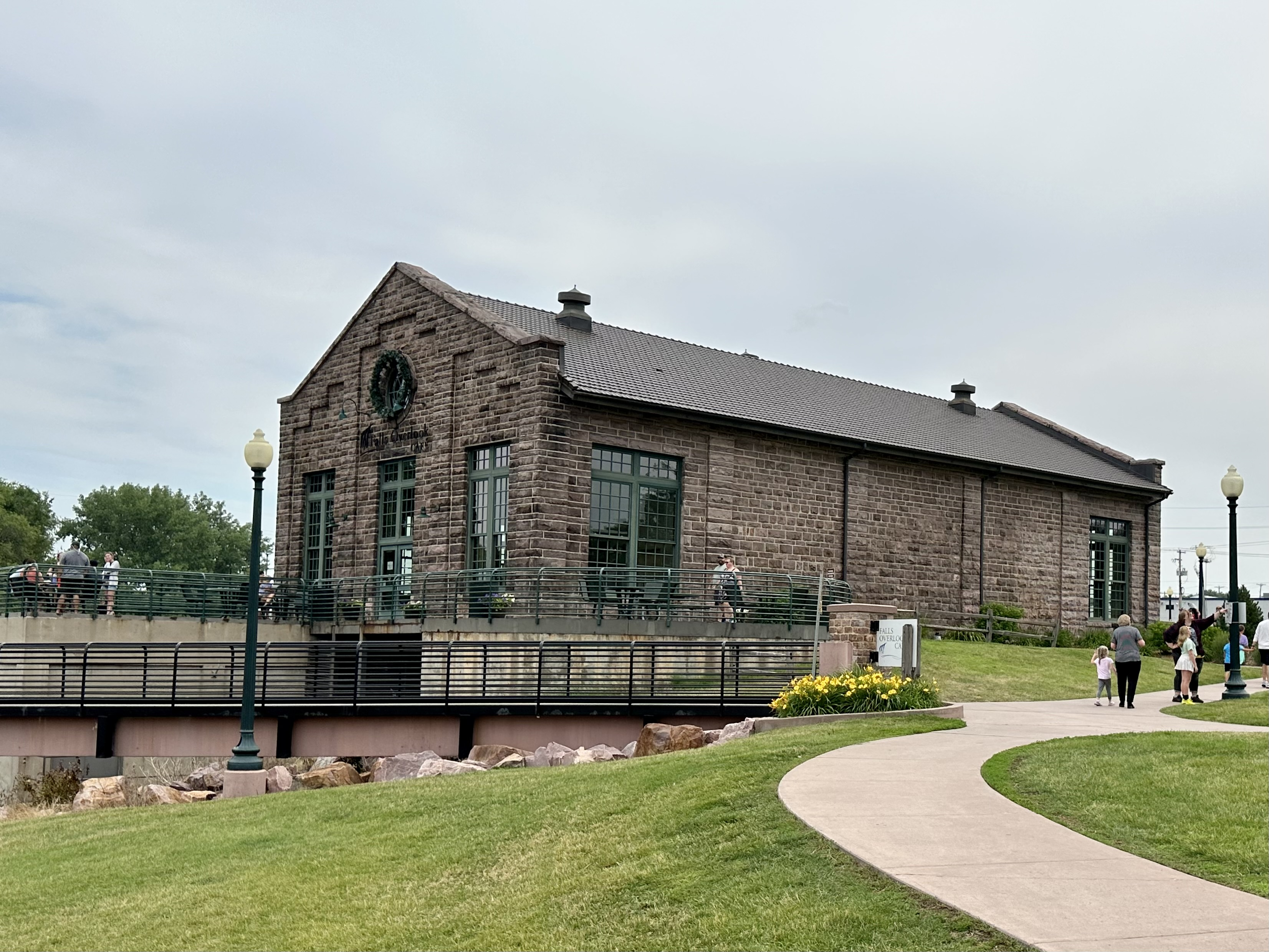
The Falls Overlook Cafe is housed inside the 1908 Sioux Falls Light & Power Co. hydroelectric plant.

=== Falls Overlook Café ===
The Falls Overlook Café is across the river from the observation tower and is housed inside the 1908 Sioux Falls Light & Power Co. hydroelectric plant. It is open for lunch and dinner every day during the summer months.

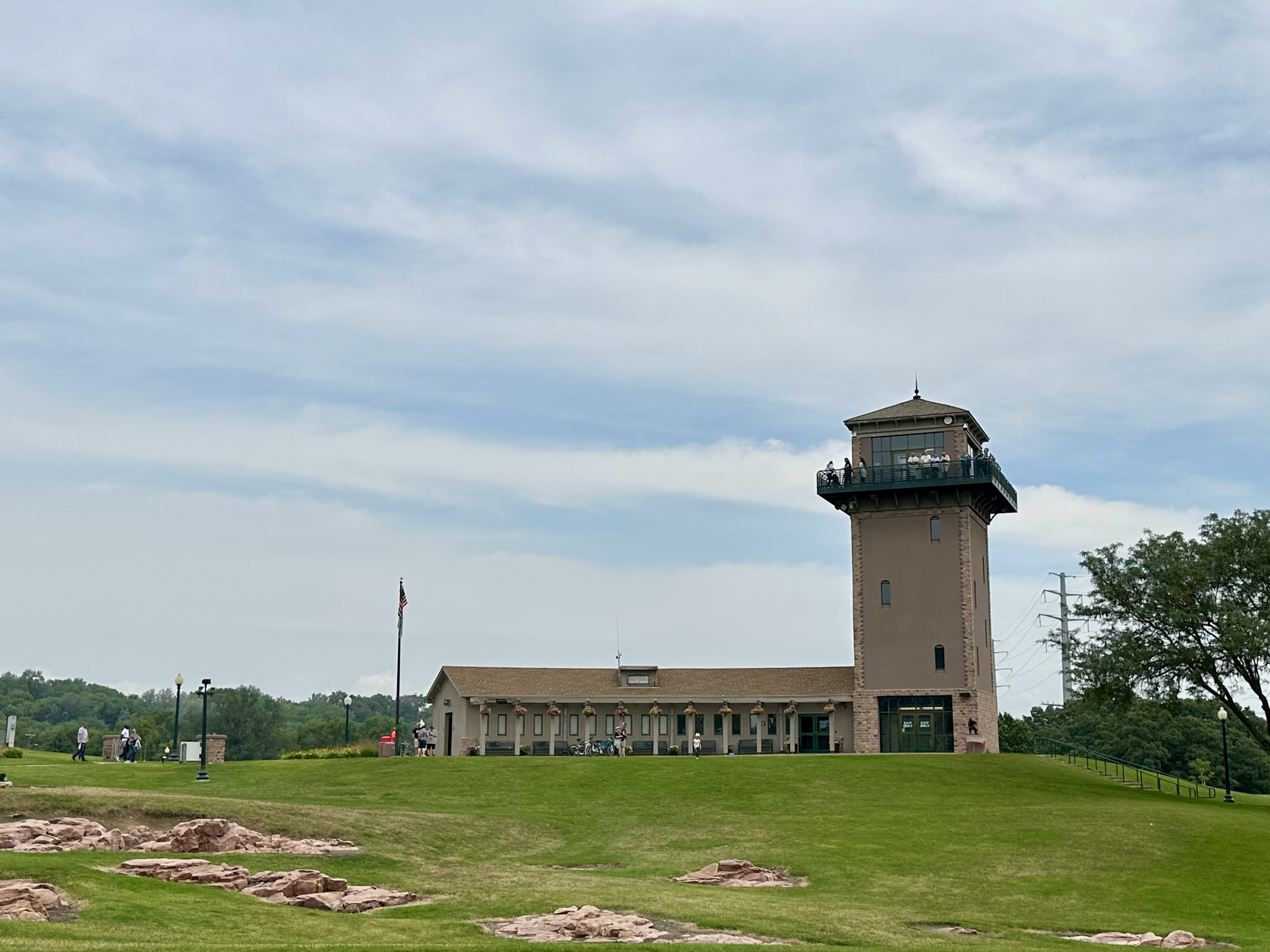
The Falls Park Observation tower

=== Observation tower ===
The observation tower is connected to the visitor center. The visitor center offers guidance to those visiting the city as well as a variety of Sioux Falls souvenirs.

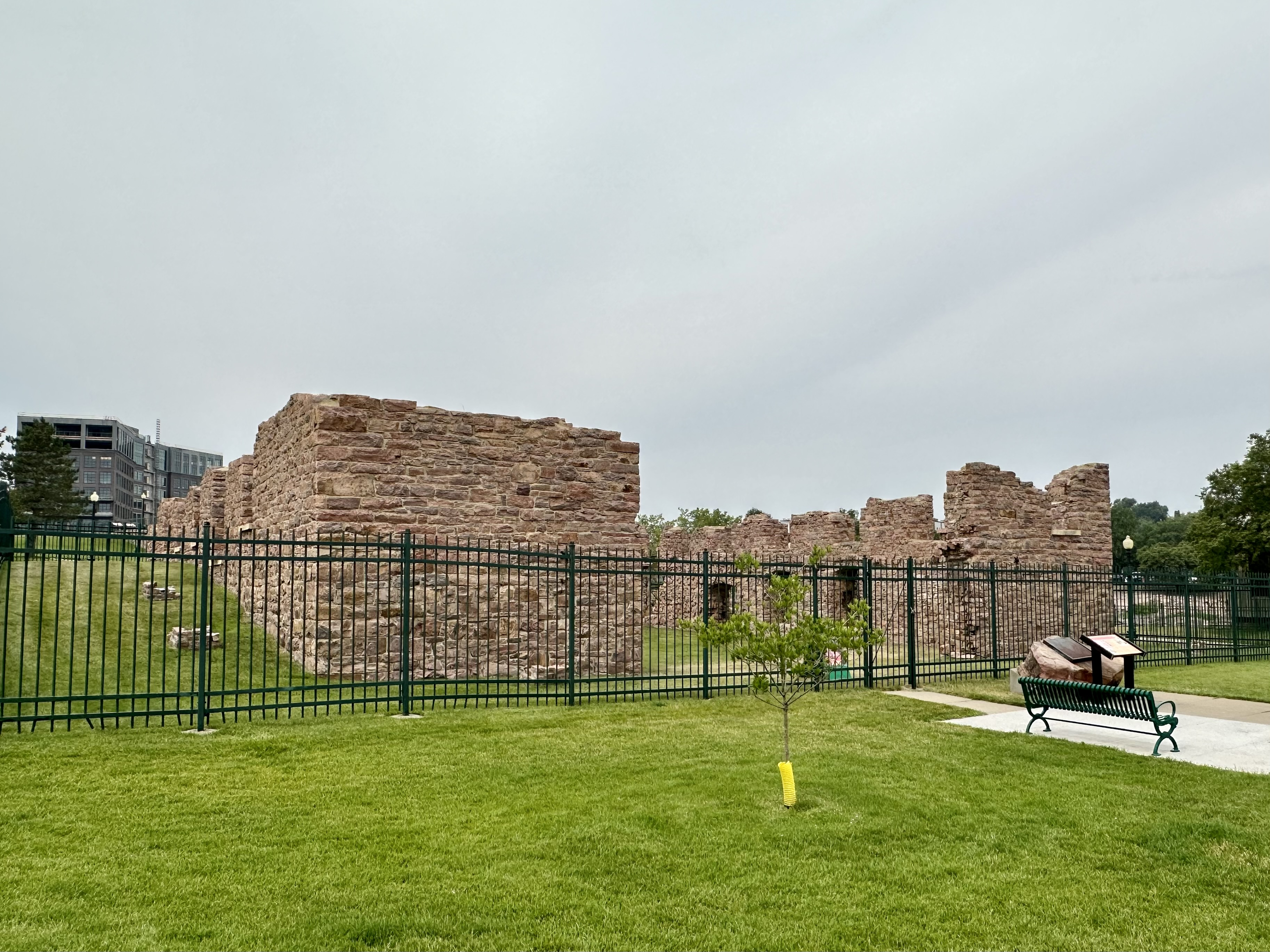
The Queen Bee Mill foundation is all that remains of the mill. Completed in 1881, the Mill included a seven-story building.

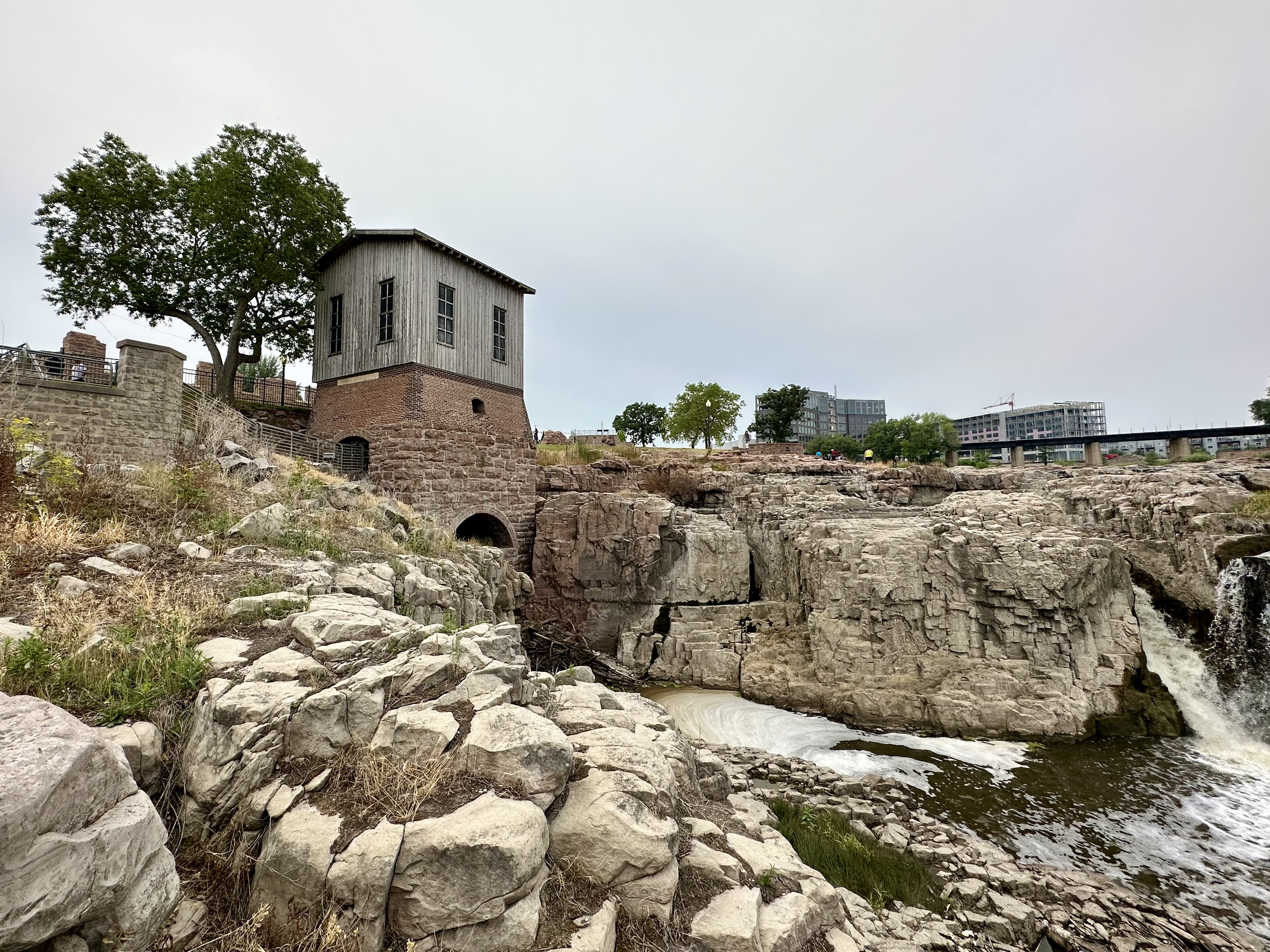
Queen Bee Turbine House

=== Queen Bee Mill ===
The mill opened in late 1881, consisting of a seven-story main structure built of Sioux quartzite quarried on site. Nearly $500,000 was spent on the construction of the state-of-the-art mill and its supporting structures. The mill could process 1,500 bushels each day. However, the mill closed by 1883, a victim of inadequate water power and a short supply of wheat.

=== Stockyards Ag Experience Barn ===
Little is known about the history of the Sioux quartzite barn on the northern edge of Falls Park. Oral history has suggested the building was constructed in the late 1800s as a part of a dairy/creamery operation, though there are no historical records to substantiate this. The City of Sioux Falls has owned the structure since 1917. At that time, animals performing city work were stabled there. The barn is now home to the Stockyards Ag Experience, a museum and learning center that connects visitors to agriculture.
