= Security Bank Building (Sioux Falls, South Dakota) =

- U.S. National Register of Historic Places
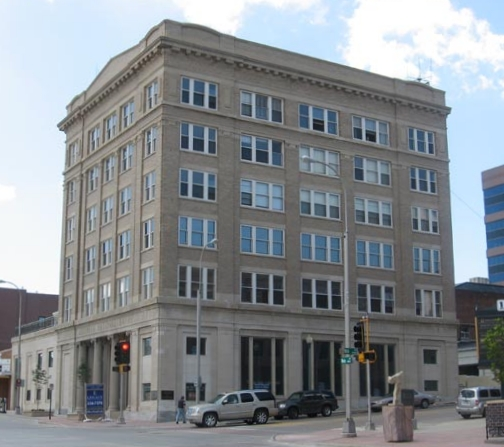
- Security Bank Building in 2009

- Location within South Dakota Location within the United States
- Location: 101 S. Main Ave., Sioux Falls, South Dakota
- Coordinates: 43°32′50″N 96°43′43″W
- Area: less than one acre
- Built: 1915–1916
- Architect: E. Jackson Casse Company
- Architectural style: Classical Revival
- NRHP reference No.: 84003366
- Added to NRHP: February 23, 1984

The Security Bank Building, also known as the Security Building, is a historic commercial building at 101 South Main Avenue in downtown Sioux Falls, South Dakota. It was the first steel-framed office building to be built in the state. It was added to the National Register of Historic Places in 1984 for its architectural design and integrity, as well as for being the site of a bank robbery by the Dillinger Gang in 1934.

== History ==
After the beginning of the 20th century, Sioux Falls began to experience a major economic boom. New shops, hotels, offices, and other businesses—many of which were high-rises—were being established at a rapid pace, especially in the downtown area. Contributing to this boom was the success of the Security National Bank in Sioux Falls, which had been founded on July 8, 1890, as the State Banking & Trust Company. It changed its name on June 11, 1912, to the State Bank & Trust Company. It was incorporated as a national bank on July 28, 1914, and the name again changed to Security National Bank of Sioux Falls.

By the mid-1910s, the bank had outgrown its original headquarters building and began looking to expand. Security National Bank reached out to Chicago-based architectural firm E. Jackson Casse Company, who designed a six-story steel-frame building that would sit on the corner of Main Avenue and Ninth Street. The proposed location was on the site of an old theater building. Security National and two other banks also occupied this intersection, making Main and Ninth the contemporary financial hub of the city. This new building would not only host the bank but also offices for numerous other businesses. The Security Bank Building was constructed between 1915 and 1916. Construction was delayed due to a steel shortage caused by World War I. Its grand opening was held on January 2, 1917. When completed, it became the first steel-framed office building in South Dakota.

In April 1929, the Security National Bank institution was one of several Midwestern banks that merged into the new Northwest Bancorporation of Minneapolis, an organization of 14 banks, five of which were in South Dakota. At the time of the merge, the bank's assets totalled just under $6,000,000; as the Northwest Bancorporation, all banks had combined assets totalling $168,000,000. On August 31, 1935, the bank was renamed Northwest Security National Bank. At this time, the bank also absorbed five smaller banks across South Dakota, which became branch locations: the Brookings County Bank in Brookings, First National Bank & Trust in Chamberlain, First National Bank in Dell Rapids, National Bank of Huron, and Northwestern National Bank of Madison. Northwest Security National Bank of Sioux Falls later absorbed Northwestern Bank of Gregory in 1936, and the First National Bank of Pukwana and the Corn Exchange Savings Bank in 1937.

=== 1934 Dillinger Gang robbery ===
Around 9:50 a.m. on the morning of March 6, 1934, six members of the Dillinger Gang, armed with Thompson submachine guns, stormed the bank building and robbed it of $46,000. As the green Packard car approached the bank, several employees had remarked that it looked like a holdup car, and one of them pressed the alarm button. Four of the robbers entered the bank, while two remained outside, firing into the air to warn onlookers. Hale Keith, a policeman who had approached to investigate, was spotted through the windows by George "Baby Face" Nelson, who fired on Keith and then shouted, "I got one!". Keith was seriously wounded but survived. Other police officers who arrived were not adequately prepared to face off against the gang and were quickly captured, rounded up, and made to stand facing the wall. A crowd of 30 hostages was forced to surround the gang in a human shield and walk them out to their getaway car. Five bank employees—Leo Olson, Mildred Bostwick, Emma Knabach, Alice Blegen, and Mary Lucas—were kept as hostages and made to stand on the running board of the car to shield the robbers from police gunfire.

The car stopped briefly in front of 211 South Main Avenue, where the gang argued whether or not they should take another car, but they decided against it; they eventually stole two other cars, as their own was by that point too heavily damaged to continue. The gang stopped again on Minnesota Avenue, where Olson was let go and the remaining four hostages were brought into the car. Once the convoy was far outside of town, the remaining hostages were released near Shindler. Despite high tensions and Keith's wounds, no deaths resulted from the robbery. The bank robbers were trailed over several miles by police and airplanes, with several shootouts, but eventually got away. The building itself suffered damage to its windows, door, and exterior from the gunfire. None of the stolen money was ever recovered. The gang's crime spree would come to a halt when John Dillinger was gunned down by the FBI in July 1934; whether or not Dillinger himself was actually at the Sioux Falls robbery remains a point of debate. This robbery was portrayed in the 2009 movie Public Enemies.

== Architecture ==
The Security Bank Building is located on the southwest corner of Main Avenue and Ninth Street. It is six stories tall, standing 130 ft (40 m) high, and sits on a concrete foundation. Its frame is crafted from structural steel, and the exterior is clad in Bedford limestone. The E. Jackson Casse Company designed it in the Classical Revival architectural style, which is especially evident with the four large Ionic columns in front of the main entrance and the decorative elements on the building's cornice and shed roof. Additions were added to the south side of the building in 1951 and 1957.
