= Renner, South Dakota =

Renner
- Unincorporated community
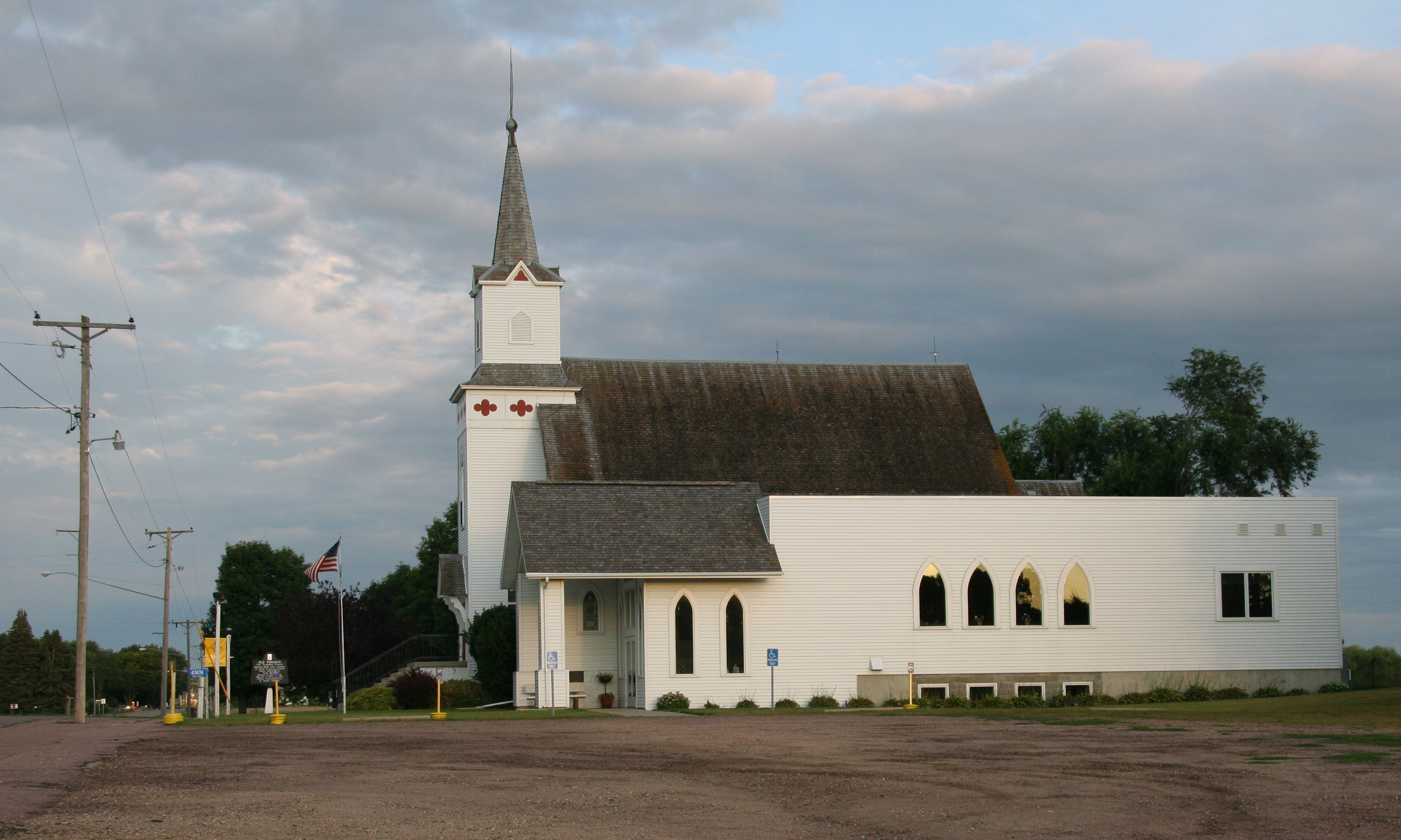
- Renner Lutheran Church

- Location within the state of South Dakota
- Coordinates: 43°38′44″N 096°43′41″W
- Country: United States
- State: South Dakota
- County: Minnehaha
- Founded: 1898
- Named for: Leonard Renner
- Elevation: 1,434 ft (437 m)
- Time zone: UTC-6 (Central (CST))
  - Summer (DST): UTC-5 (CDT)
- ZIP codes: 57055
- Area code: 605
- FIPS code: 46-54140
- GNIS feature ID: 1257356

Renner is an unincorporated community in Minnehaha County in the U.S. state of South Dakota. Renner has been assigned the ZIP code of 57055. The demographics of Renner are not listed separately by the United States Census Bureau, but are included within those of Mapleton Township. As of the 2020 United States census, there were 2,099 people residing in the township.

Renner lies just north of Sioux Falls on South Dakota Highway 115. It lies in the valley of the Big Sioux River on a line of the Chicago, Milwaukee, St. Paul and Pacific Railroad, now owned by the state of South Dakota and operated by D&I Railroad.

After completing the first non-stop solo flight across the Atlantic Ocean in May 1927, Charles Lindbergh made a stop in Renner on August 27, 1927. Contemporary estimates reported that between thirty and forty thousand people came to Renner to welcome him.

== History ==
Renner was founded in 1898, and a depot along the Milwaukee Railroad was built here in 1907. The town is named after Leonard Renner, a local farmer on whose land the depot was built. One of the earliest rural electrification projects in the United States was undertaken here by Northern States Power Company in 1923, three years before a better-known project near Red Wing, Minnesota. Both projects were a success from the farmers' standpoint, but the overall cost to the company for each project versus the small revenue from each generally dissuaded the company from further attempts at rural electrification.

=== Renner Church ===
Renner Lutheran Church, founded in 1868 as Nidaros Church by Norwegian immigrants, is reportedly the oldest ELCA church in South Dakota. The church is listed on the National Register of Historic Places as Renner Lutheran Sanctuary.
