= Big Sioux River =

River in eastern South Dakota and northwestern Iowa

- The falls of the Big Sioux River at Sioux Falls, South Dakota

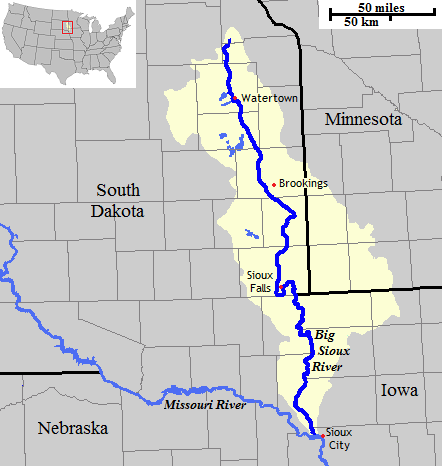
- The course and watershed of the Big Sioux River.
- Etymology: Dakota people
- Native name: C̣aƞ Kaṡdéc̣a (Dakota)

Location
- Country: United States
- State: South Dakota, Iowa

Physical characteristics
- Source: Coteau des Prairies
  - location: Roberts County, South Dakota
- Mouth: Missouri River
  - location: Sioux City, Iowa
  - coordinates: 42.490805°N 96.445490°W
- Length: 419 mi (674 km)
- Basin size: 9,006 mi^{2} (23,330 km^{2})

Basin features
- Progression: generally southwardly
- Tributaries
  - left: Mahoney Creek, Rock River, Broken Kettle Creek
  - right: Skunk Creek

The Big Sioux River is a tributary of the Missouri River in eastern South Dakota and northwestern Iowa in the United States. It flows generally southwardly for 419 mi (674 km), and its watershed is 9,006 mi^{2} (23,330 km^{2}). The United States Board on Geographic Names settled on "Big Sioux River" as the stream's name in 1931. The river is named after the Dakota people, who have known it as C̣aƞ Kaṡdéc̣a, or Wood Split by Striking.

The Big Sioux River rises in Roberts County, South Dakota, on a low plateau known as the Coteau des Prairies and flows generally southwardly through Grant, Codington, Hamlin, Brookings, Moody, and Minnehaha counties, past the communities of Watertown, Castlewood, Bruce, Flandreau, Egan, Trent, Dell Rapids, and Baltic to Sioux Falls, where it passes over a waterfall in Falls Park, which gives that city its name. Downstream of Sioux Falls and the community of Brandon, the Big Sioux defines the boundary between South Dakota and Iowa, flowing along the eastern borders of Lincoln and Union counties in South Dakota, and the western borders of Lyon, Sioux and Plymouth counties in Iowa, past the communities of Canton, Fairview, Hudson, Hawarden, North Sioux City, and Dakota Dunes in South Dakota and Beloit, Hawarden and Akron in Iowa. It joins the Missouri River from the north at Sioux City, Iowa.

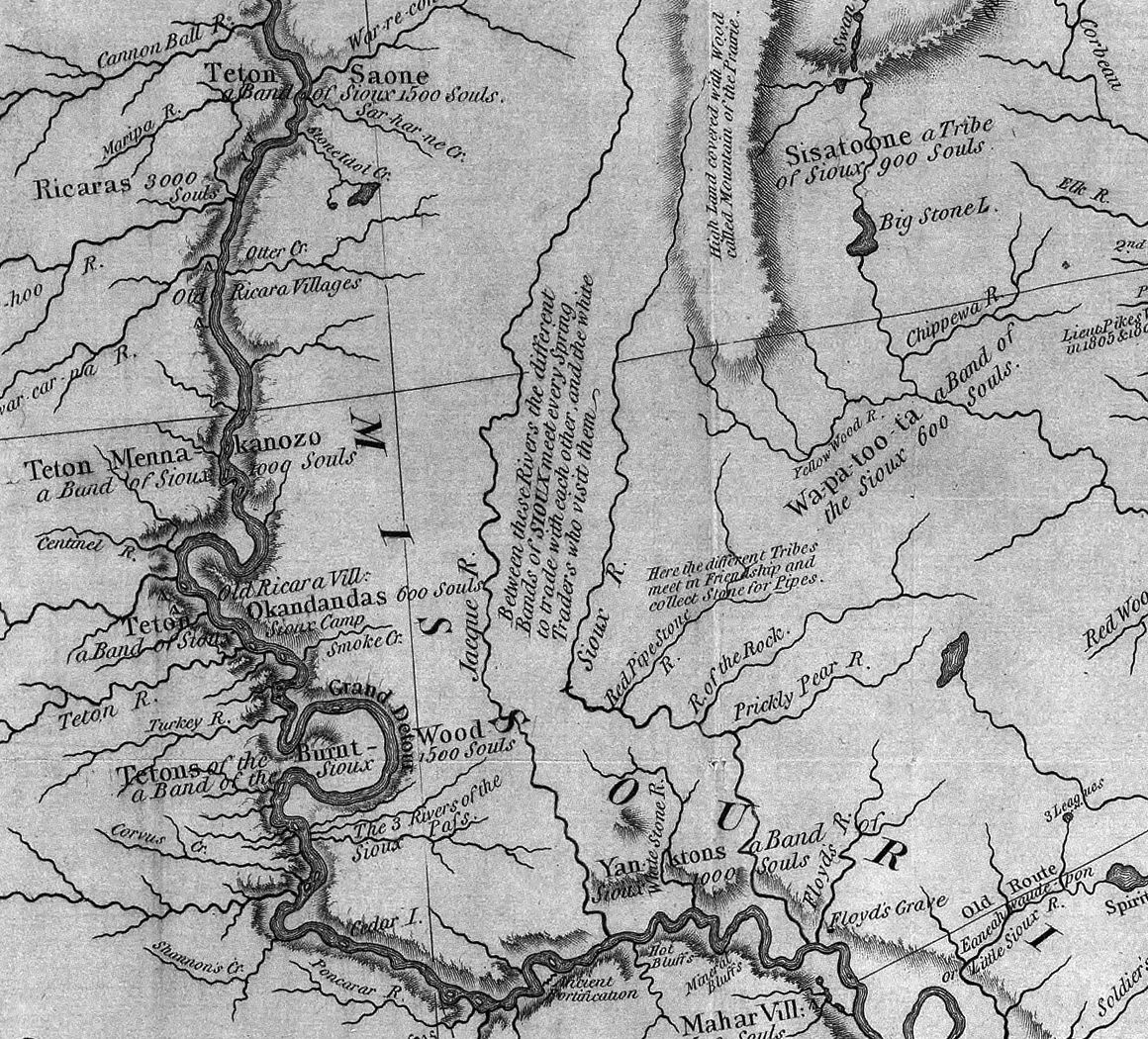
This excerpt from the Lewis and Clark map of 1814 shows the rivers of western Iowa and eastern South Dakota. The Big Sioux River ("Sioux") is seen near the center of the map.

The Big Sioux River, at the USGS station in Sioux City, Iowa, has a mean annual discharge of approximately 3,793 cubic feet per second.

== Tributaries ==
The Big Sioux River collects the Rock River from the northeast in Sioux County, Iowa. A minor headwaters tributary of the Big Sioux in Grant County, South Dakota, is known as the Indian River. Broken Kettle Creek has its confluence with the Big Sioux in Plymouth County, Iowa.

Other creek tributaries include Peg Munky Run, North Deer, Sixmile, Skunk, Split Rock, Beaver, Brule, and Pipestone.

== Pollution ==
The Big Sioux is South Dakota's most populated river basin. Agriculture is the primary use of land along most of the river's course. To comply with the Clean Water Act, the state monitors water quality of its rivers. Most of the Big Sioux north of Sioux Falls was scored well in 2012. Portions near Lake Kampeska and between Willow and Stray Horse Creeks (Codington and Hamlin counties) exceeded federally allowable levels of E. coli and fecal coliform bacteria. However, the Big Sioux south of Sioux Falls is much more polluted with E. coli, fecal coliform, and suspended solids. Several portions heavily restrict fishing or human contact, and swimming is banned.

== Flood control ==
Between 1955 and 1961, an extensive flood control system was constructed by the U.S. Army Corps of Engineers along the Big Sioux and some of its tributaries in Sioux Falls to protect the city from a 100-year flood event. Features of the system include 29 miles (47 km) of levees, a floodwall in downtown, and a 15,000 feet (4,600 m) diversion channel with a dam at one end and a 118-foot (36 m) spillway at the other. The diversion channel connects two ends of the Big Sioux's natural loop around central Sioux Falls in an effort to channel floodwater away from the city. The levees then act to contain any floodwater either remaining in the natural channel or originating from Skunk Creek (whose mouth is downriver of the diversion dam). Additionally, a greenway covers much of the river's floodplain in southern and eastern Sioux Falls, further mitigating any property damage from high water.

=== Flooding ===
The Big Sioux River experienced record-breaking flooding during the 2019 Midwestern U.S. floods.

The Big Sioux River Flood Information System was used to model flooding during the March 2019 bomb cyclone event.

The river overflowed its banks between September 12–15, 2019, flooding three blocks of Dell Rapids, South Dakota, and damaging up to a dozen homes. Interstate 90 was shut down between Mitchell and Sioux Falls.

The river once again flooded in 2024, resulting in at least one death and multiple destroyed homes, roads, and businesses, most notably in the McCook Lake area.

== See also ==
- Big Sioux Recreation Area
- Blood Run Site — Native American Settlement
- Floyd River
- List of river borders of U.S. states
- List of rivers of Iowa
- List of rivers of South Dakota
- Little Sioux River
- Siouxland
