= Brandon, South Dakota =

- City
- Flag
- Motto: "Building a Better Life"
- Location in Minnehaha County and the state of South Dakota
- Coordinates: 43°35′35″N 96°36′20″W
- Country: United States
- State: South Dakota
- County: Minnehaha
- Incorporated (city): 1973

Area
  - Total: 5.76 sq mi (14.93 km^{2})
  - Land: 5.72 sq mi (14.82 km^{2})
  - Water: 0.042 sq mi (0.11 km^{2})
- Elevation: 1,352 ft (412 m)

Population (2020)
  - Total: 11,048
  - Density: 1,930.8/sq mi (745.48/km^{2})
- Time zone: UTC−6 (Central)
  - Summer (DST): UTC−5 (Central)
- ZIP code: 57005
- Area code: 605
- FIPS code: 46-06840
- GNIS feature ID: 1267292
- Website: City of Brandon

Brandon is a city in Minnehaha County, South Dakota, United States. Brandon is located five miles east of Sioux Falls. The population was 11,048 as of the 2020 census.

== History ==
A post office called Brandon has been in operation since 1878. The city took its name from Brandon Township.

== Geography ==
Brandon is located along the Big Sioux River and Split Rock Creek.

According to the United States Census Bureau, the city has a total area of 5.41 square miles (14.01 km^{2}), of which 5.37 square miles (13.91 km^{2}) is land and 0.04 square miles (0.10 km^{2}) is water.

== Demographics ==
Historical population
Census	Pop.	Note	%±
1950	200		—
1960	696		248.0%
1970	1,431		105.6%
1980	2,589		80.9%
1990	3,545		36.9%
2000	5,693		60.6%
2010	8,785		54.3%
2020	11,048		25.8%
U.S. Decennial Census; 2017 Estimate

=== 2020 census ===
As of the 2020 census, Brandon had a population of 11,048. The median age was 35.4 years. 31.6% of residents were under the age of 18 and 12.4% of residents were 65 years of age or older. For every 100 females there were 99.6 males, and for every 100 females age 18 and over there were 94.2 males age 18 and over.

98.9% of residents lived in urban areas, while 1.1% lived in rural areas.

There were 3,888 households in Brandon, of which 44.7% had children under the age of 18 living in them. Of all households, 61.5% were married-couple households, 13.0% were households with a male householder and no spouse or partner present, and 20.2% were households with a female householder and no spouse or partner present. About 20.6% of all households were made up of individuals and 9.0% had someone living alone who was 65 years of age or older.

There were 4,038 housing units, of which 3.7% were vacant. The homeowner vacancy rate was 1.1% and the rental vacancy rate was 6.7%.

Racial composition as of the 2020 census
Race	Number	Percent
White	10,191	92.2%
Black or African American	119	1.1%
American Indian and Alaska Native	79	0.7%
Asian	80	0.7%
Native Hawaiian and Other Pacific Islander	4	0.0%
Some other race	98	0.9%
Two or more races	477	4.3%
Hispanic or Latino (of any race)	266	2.4%

=== 2010 census ===
As of the 2010 census, there were 8,785 people, 3,118 households, and 2,417 families residing in the city. The population density was 1,635.9 inhabitants per square mile (631.6/km^{2}). There were 3,238 housing units at an average density of 603.0 per square mile (232.8/km^{2}). The racial makeup of the city was 96.8% White, 0.6% African American, 0.5% Native American, 0.6% Asian, 0.3% from other races, and 1.2% from two or more races. Hispanic or Latino of any race were 1.2% of the population.

There were 3,118 households, of which 48.2% had children under the age of 18 living with them, 64.2% were married couples living together, 9.4% had a female householder with no husband present, 3.9% had a male householder with no wife present, and 22.5% were non-families. 18.5% of all households were made up of individuals, and 6.6% had someone living alone who was 65 years of age or older. The average household size was 2.82 and the average family size was 3.22.

The median age in the city was 32.9 years. 33.2% of residents were under the age of 18; 5.6% were between the ages of 18 and 24; 31% were from 25 to 44; 22.3% were from 45 to 64; and 7.8% were 65 years of age or older. The gender makeup of the city was 49.6% male and 50.4% female.

== Parks and recreation ==
The Great Bear Recreation Park is located 2.5 miles (4 km) to the west of Brandon on Rice Street.

The Big Sioux Recreation Area, a state recreation area consisting of a large forest surrounding the park's namesake Big Sioux River, is located west of Robert Bennis Elementary. It features many hiking and biking trails and bridges over the river, as well as camping sites and playgrounds.

== Education ==
Students in Brandon are served by the Brandon Valley School District. As South Dakota allows parents to enroll their students at any school district, regardless of district boundaries, the school district also serves students from the surrounding areas.

The Brandon Valley School District currently operates one high school, one middle school, one intermediate school, and five elementary schools. Brandon Valley High School, Brandon Valley Middle School, Brandon Valley Intermediate School, Brandon Elementary School, Robert Bennis Elementary School, Burkman Valley Elementary are all located within Brandon's city limits, while Inspiration Elementary School and Fred Assam Elementary School are located a few miles southwest, in eastern Sioux Falls. It also operates the Brandon Valley Performing Arts Center. which opened in 1999 within the high school.

In fall of 2015, the Brandon Valley School District added an intermediate school. The school is adjacent to Robert Bennis Elementary School and educates fifth and sixth grade students. Because the city's population had been increasing exponentially, district officials were concerned that Brandon Valley Middle School, which served grades 6–8, was reaching capacity. Voters living within the district voted to fund $5.95 million of the estimated $14 million required to build the school by way of property tax.

== Infrastructure ==
Interstate 90, the longest interstate highway in the United States, is located along the city's northern border with Corson and serves as a major east–west route through the city. South Dakota Highway 11 (known as Splitrock Boulevard in the city limits) runs a north–south route as well. Most businesses in Brandon are located on Splitrock Boulevard. Other major roads include Holly Boulevard, Sioux Boulevard, and Aspen Boulevard. Aspen Boulevard directly connects Brandon to other communities to the east such as Valley Springs, South Dakota; Beaver Creek, Minnesota; and Luverne, Minnesota.

== Major events ==
Since 2013, Automania, the largest free car show in the region, has taken place along Holly Boulevard in the summer. The event brought more than 70,000 people to Brandon when it took place in 2013. AutoMania is now held 10 miles (16 km) east, in Valley Springs, SD.

== Notable person ==
- Dale Moss – contestant on the 16th season of The Bachelorette.
