= Brandon Valley School District =

School district in Brandon, South Dakota, United States

Address
- 301 South Splitrock Blvd Brandon, South Dakota, 57005; United States

District information
- Grades: PK–12
- Established: 1916; 110 years ago
- Superintendent: Jarod Larson
- Schools: 12
- NCES District ID: 4607950

Students and staff
- Enrollment: 4,948 (2022–23)
- Teachers: 285.89 (FTE)
- Student–teacher ratio: 17.31
- District mascot: Lynx

Other information
- Telephone: (605) 582-2049
- Website: www.brandonvalley.k12.sd.us

The Brandon Valley School District is a public school district in Minnehaha County, based in Brandon, South Dakota. It serves the communities of Brandon and the nearby town of Valley Springs.

== History ==
Brandon Elementary School was the start of the district in 1916. Additions were made in the 1930s and in 1987. The Brandon Valley Performing Arts Center, which seats 800 people, opened in 1999.

In 2003, Robert Bennis Elementary School opened to serve students in the southern half of Brandon. Fred Assam Elementary opened in 2009 to relieve pressure on the two elementary Schools in Brandon.

== Schools ==
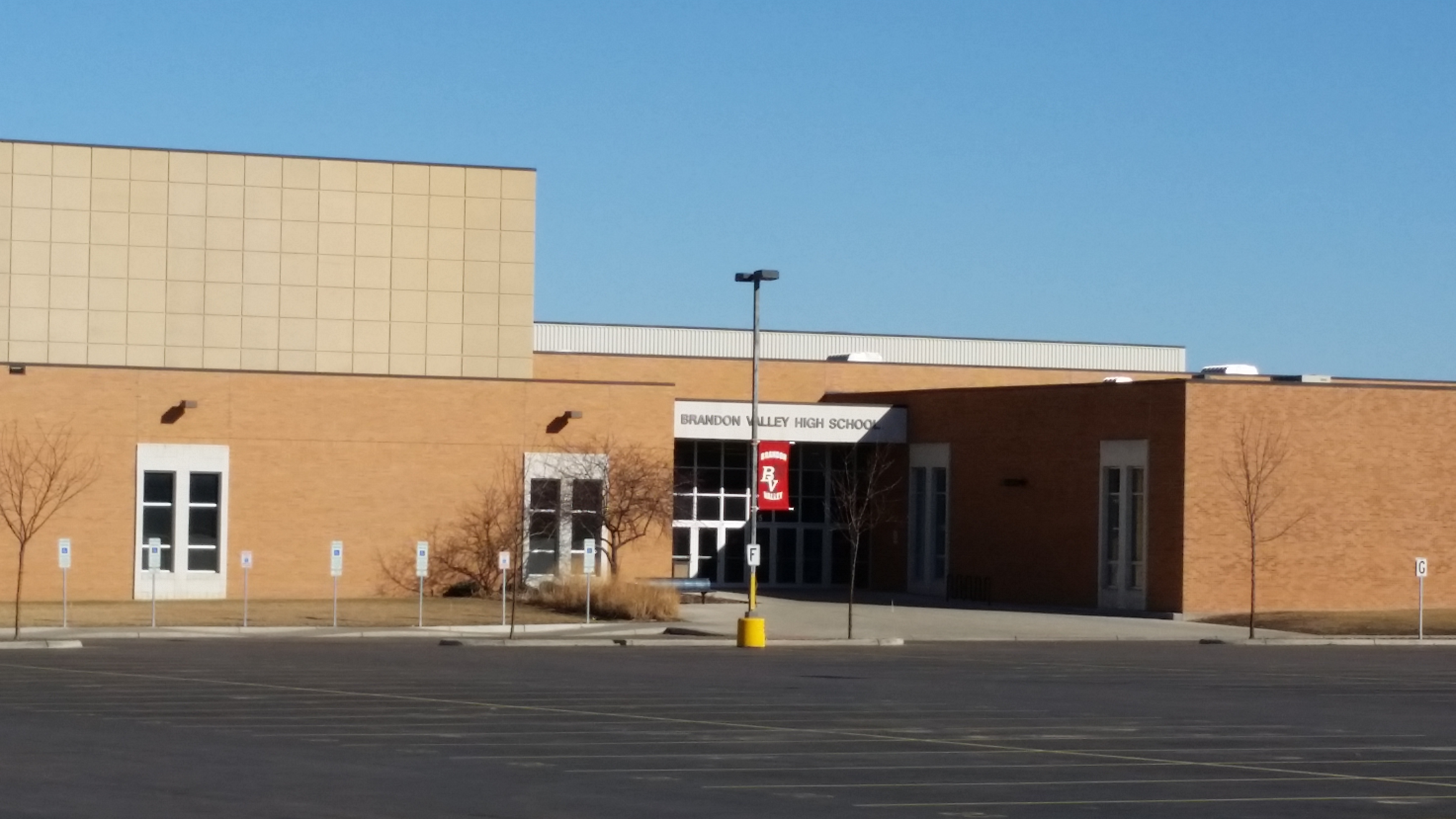
Brandon Valley High School, back entrance

The Brandon Valley School District has five elementary schools, one intermediate school, one middle school, and one high school.

=== Elementary schools ===
- Brandon Elementary School
- Fred Assam Elementary School
- Robert Bennis Elementary School
- Valley Springs Elementary School
- Inspiration Elementary School

== Notable Graduates ==
- Dale Moss – former football player and contestant on the 16th season of The Bachelorette.
- Cody Strand – former Book Of Mormon Actor
