= Ihlen =

Ihlen can refer to:

- Ihlen, Minnesota, a city in Pipestone County, Minnesota, United States
- Nils Claus Ihlen, Norwegian diplomat
- German exonym for the village Īle, Latvia
- Archaic name for Ila, Norway, site of Ila Prison
