= Lyons, South Dakota =

- unincorporated community
- Interactive map of Lyons, South Dakota
- Coordinates: 43°43′30″N 96°51′58″W
- Country: United States
- State: South Dakota
- County: Minnehaha

Area
  - Total: 0.50 sq mi (1.30 km^{2})
  - Land: 0.50 sq mi (1.30 km^{2})
  - Water: 0 sq mi (0.00 km^{2})
- Elevation: 1,568 ft (478 m)

Population (2020)
  - Total: 70
  - Density: 139.3/sq mi (53.78/km^{2})
- Time zone: UTC-6 (Central (CST))
  - Summer (DST): UTC-5 (CDT)
- ZIP code: 57041
- Area code: 605
- FIPS code: 46-39780
- GNIS feature ID: 2813055

Lyons is an unincorporated community and census-designated place (CDP) in Minnehaha County, South Dakota, United States. The CDP had a population of 70 at the 2020 census. Lyons has been assigned the ZIP code of 57041.

Lyons was laid out in 1886, and named after Lyons Township.

== Demographics ==
Historical population
Census	Pop.	Note	%±
2020	70		—
U.S. Decennial Census
