= Pipestone Creek (Big Sioux River tributary) =

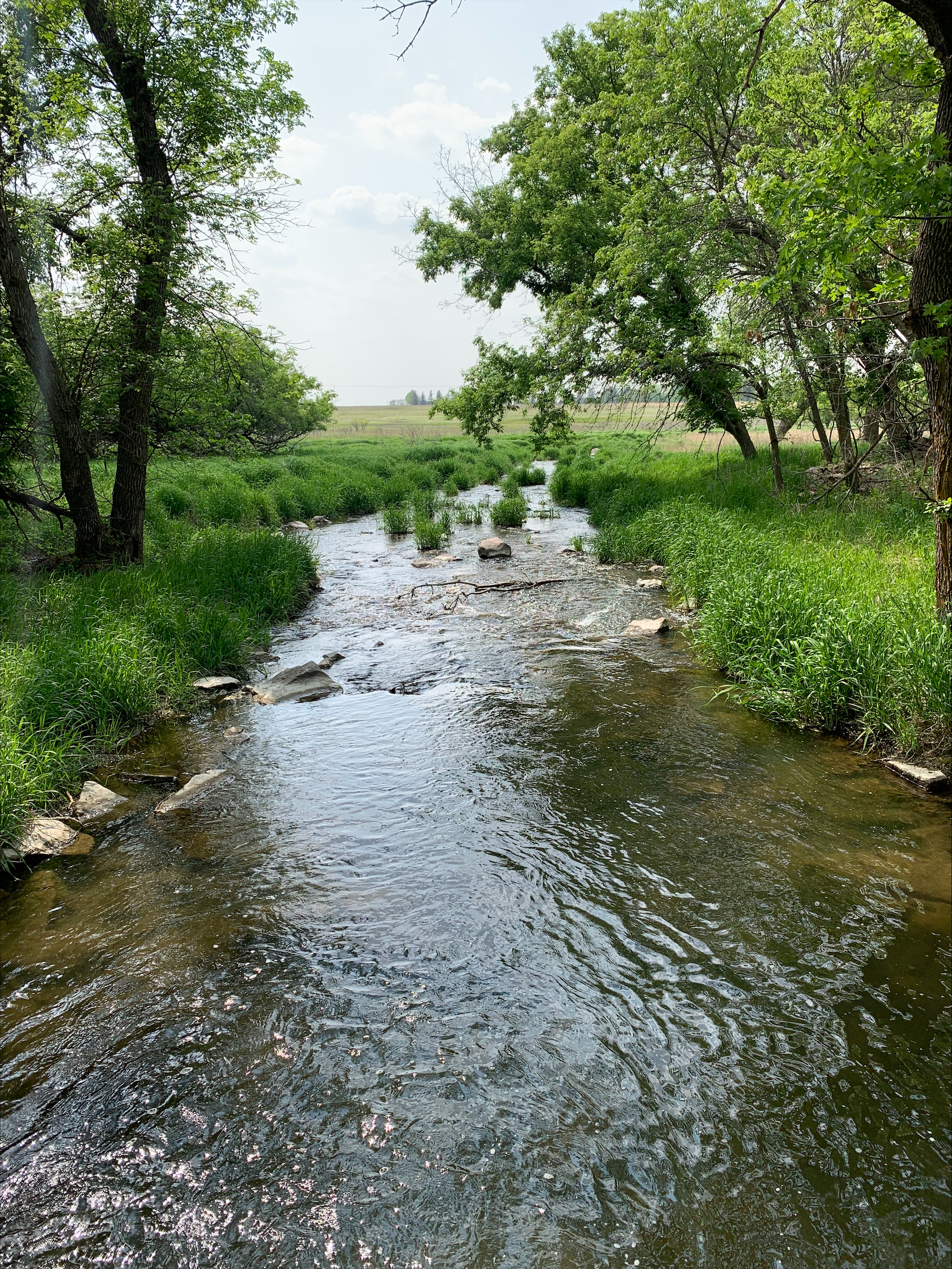
- Pipestone Creek flowing through the grounds of Pipestone National Monument

- Mouth of the Pipestone Creek

Location
- Country: United States
- State: Minnesota, South Dakota
- County: Pipestone County, Minnesota, Moody County, South Dakota

Physical characteristics
- Source
  - coordinates: 44.031081°N 96.2903114°W
- Mouth
  - coordinates: 43°48′14″N 96°26′28″W
- Length: 53.2-mile-long (85.6 km)

Pipestone Creek is a 53.2-mile-long (85.6 km) river in southwestern Minnesota and southeastern South Dakota.

== Course ==
Pipestone Creek has a center branch as well as branches named "North" and "South". The creek (center branch) begins about 3 miles (5 km) north of Holland (the high point of its watershed actually being underneath the north branch's watershed) and flows southwesterly, roughly following MN State Highway 23 for much of its early existence (also being known as County Ditch Number 1). The creek approaches the town of Pipestone from the east, but turns northwesterly just before Highway 23 meets U.S. Highway 75, with the creek going under both highways in rapid succession. Flowing through Pipestone National Monument, the creek passes over Winnewissa Falls, and then enters the adjacent State DNR controlled "Pipestone Wildlike Management Area" where a small "impoundment" (dam) forms "Indian Lake". The creek continues northwesterly until turning southwesterly just east of County Road 53. On the west side of County Rd 53, and on the North side of Country Rd 5, it is joined by the North branch, and on the south side of the same road, the South branch joins. The creek continues southwesterly, and crosses the state line in South Dakota above the road known as 81st Street in Minnesota and 236th A Street in South Dakota. It does not travel far into South Dakota, but loops back into Minnesota, flowing into Split Rock Creek within a mile of the state line, this confluence about 3 miles north of Sherman, South Dakota, also being 3 miles south of Jasper, Minnesota. Split Rock Creek itself is a tributary of the Big Sioux River, which in turn flows via the Missouri River and Mississippi River to the Gulf of Mexico.

== History ==
The creek was named for deposits of pipestone along its course.

== See also ==
- List of rivers of Minnesota
- List of rivers of South Dakota
