= Valley Springs =

Valley Springs may refer to some places in the United States:

- Valley Springs, Arkansas, located in Boone County
- Valley Springs, California, located in Calaveras County
- Valley Springs, South Dakota, located in Minnehaha County
