= Humboldt, South Dakota =

- City
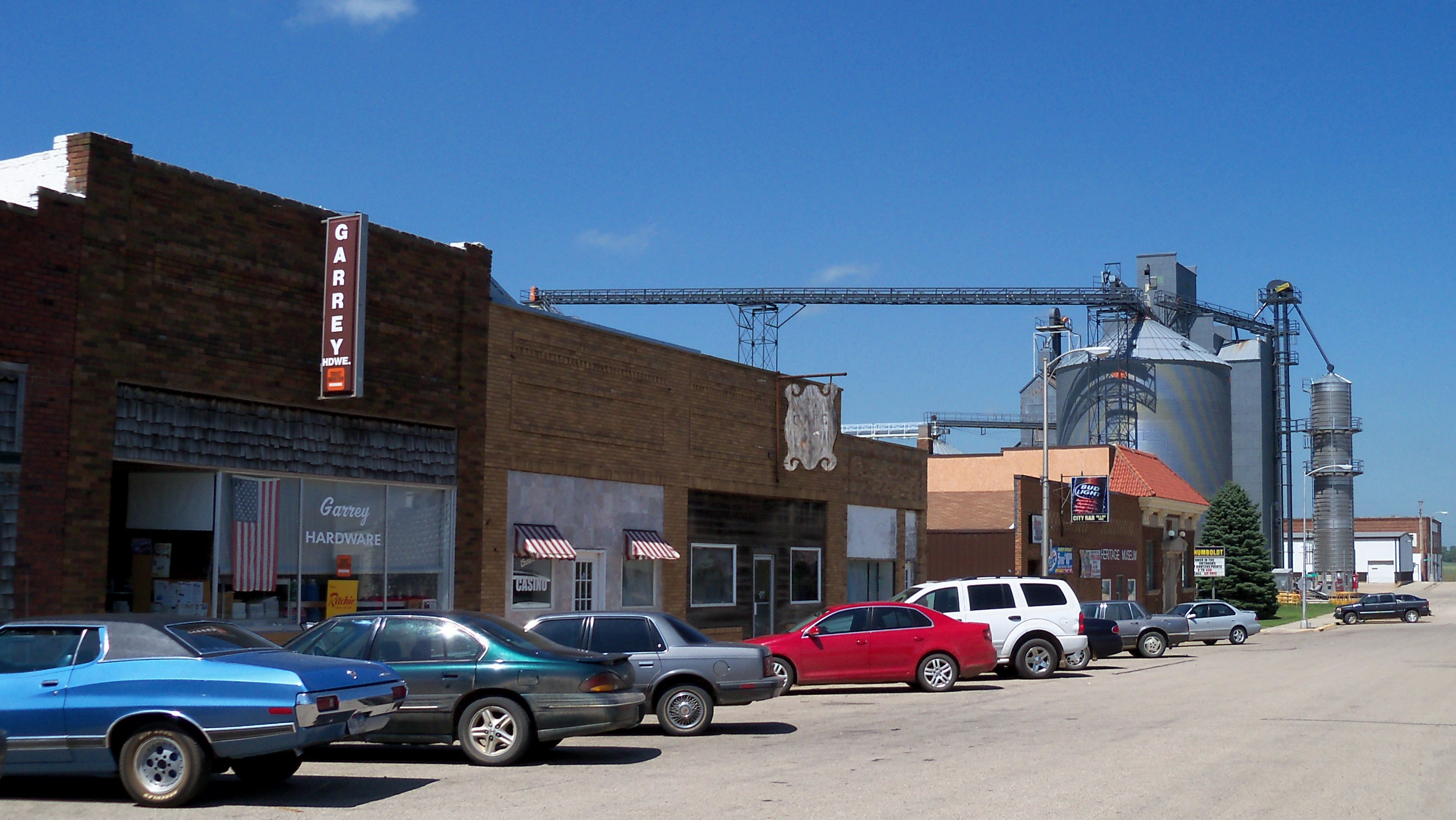
- Downtown Humboldt, South Dakota
- Motto: "Small Town With A Big Heart"
- Location in Minnehaha County and the state of South Dakota
- Coordinates: 43°38′41″N 97°04′28″W
- Country: United States
- State: South Dakota
- County: Minnehaha
- Settled: 1877
- Incorporated: 1891

Area
  - Total: 0.63 sq mi (1.64 km^{2})
  - Land: 0.62 sq mi (1.60 km^{2})
  - Water: 0.015 sq mi (0.04 km^{2})
- Elevation: 1,703 ft (519 m)

Population (2020)
  - Total: 579
  - Density: 935.3/sq mi (361.13/km^{2})
- Time zone: UTC−6 (Central (CST))
  - Summer (DST): UTC−5 (CDT)
- ZIP code: 57035
- Area code: 605
- FIPS code: 46-30900
- GNIS feature ID: 1267431
- Website: humboldtsd.org

Humboldt is a city in west central Minnehaha County, South Dakota, United States. The population was 579 at the 2020 census.

== History ==
The first settlement at Humboldt was made in 1877. The town was named from its location in Humboldt Township. A post office called Humboldt has been in operation since 1889.

== Geography ==
According to the United States Census Bureau, the town has a total area of 0.63 square miles (1.63 km^{2}), of which 0.62 square miles (1.61 km^{2}) is land and 0.01 square miles (0.03 km^{2}) is water.

Lost Lake lies two miles north of the town, while Beaver Lake lies one mile east of town.

Humboldt is accessible via exit 379, off Interstate 90, marking the halfway point on the longest interstate in the United States.

== Demographics ==
Historical population
Census	Pop.	Note	%±
1920	445		—
1930	428		−3.8%
1940	417		−2.6%
1950	450		7.9%
1960	446		−0.9%
1970	411		−7.8%
1980	487		18.5%
1990	468		−3.9%
2000	521		11.3%
2010	589		13.1%
2020	579		−1.7%
U.S. Decennial Census

=== 2010 census ===
At the 2010 census there were 589 people, 227 households, and 160 families living in the town. The population density was 950.0 inhabitants per square mile (366.8/km^{2}). There were 247 housing units at an average density of 398.4 per square mile (153.8/km^{2}). The racial makeup of the town was 95.8% White, 0.2% African American, 1.4% Native American, 1.0% from other races, and 1.7% from two or more races. Hispanic or Latino of any race were 1.5%.

Of the 227 households 39.2% had children under the age of 18 living with them, 55.1% were married couples living together, 9.7% had a female householder with no husband present, 5.7% had a male householder with no wife present, and 29.5% were non-families. 22.9% of households were one person and 8.8% were one person aged 65 or older. The average household size was 2.59 and the average family size was 3.04.

The median age in the town was 33.3 years. 30.2% of residents were under the age of 18; 6.8% were between the ages of 18 and 24; 28.1% were from 25 to 44; 21.1% were from 45 to 64; and 13.9% were 65 or older. The gender makeup of the town was 52.5% male and 47.5% female.

=== 2000 census ===
At the 2000 census, there were 521 people, 200 households, and 148 families living in the town. The population density was 831.0 inhabitants per square mile (320.9/km^{2}). There were 210 housing units at an average density of 335.0 per square mile (129.3/km^{2}). The racial makeup of the town was 96.74% White, 1.73% Native American, 0.58% Asian, 0.19% from other races, and 0.77% from two or more races. Hispanic or Latino of any race were 0.19% of the population.

Of the 200 households 42.0% had children under the age of 18 living with them, 62.0% were married couples living together, 7.0% had a female householder with no husband present, and 26.0% were non-families. 25.5% of households were one person and 15.0% were one person aged 65 or older. The average household size was 2.61 and the average family size was 3.09.

The age distribution was 31.7% under the age of 18, 6.7% from 18 to 24, 31.1% from 25 to 44, 15.9% from 45 to 64, and 14.6% 65 or older. The median age was 32 years. For every 100 females, there were 98.9 males. For every 100 females age 18 and over, there were 100.0 males.

The median household income was $39,250 and the median family income was $45,000. Males had a median income of $27,426 versus $22,083 for females. The per capita income for the town was $16,455. About 5.8% of families and 6.1% of the population were below the poverty line, including 8.2% of those under age 18 and 5.1% of those age 65 or over.

== Notable people ==
- Karl Mundt, United States Congressman and Senator, was born in Humboldt.
- Larry Pressler, United States Congressman and Senator, was born in Humboldt.
