= Minnehaha County, South Dakota =

County in South Dakota, United States

- County
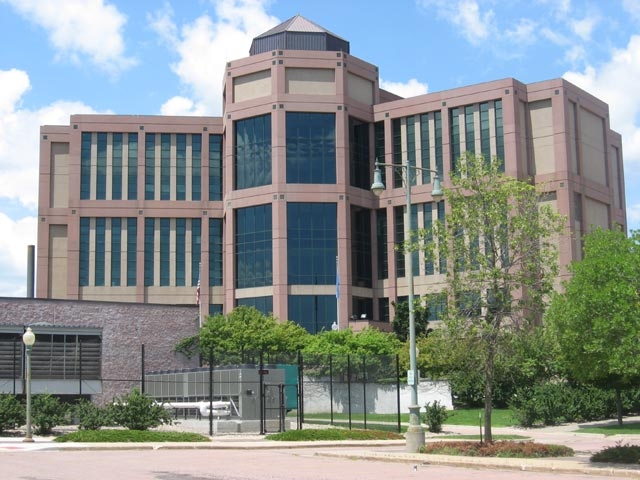
- Minnehaha County Courthouse in Sioux Falls

- Location within the U.S. state of South Dakota
- Coordinates: 43°40′2.899″N 96°47′44.613″W
- Country: United States
- State: South Dakota
- Created: 1862
- Organized: 1868
- Named for: "rapid water"
- Seat: Sioux Falls
- Largest city: Sioux Falls

Area
  - Total: 813.861 sq mi (2,107.89 km^{2})
  - Land: 806.847 sq mi (2,089.72 km^{2})
  - Water: 7.014 sq mi (18.17 km^{2}) 0.9%

Population (2020)
  - Total: 197,214
  - Estimate (2025): 212,691 ▲
  - Density: 258.586/sq mi (99.841/km^{2})
- Time zone: UTC−6 (Central)
  - Summer (DST): UTC−5 (CDT)
- Congressional district: At-large
- Website: minnehahacounty.gov

Minnehaha County is a county on the eastern border of the state of South Dakota. As of the 2020 census, the population was 197,214, making it the state's most populous county, and was estimated to be 212,691 in 2025. It contains over 22.56% of the state's population. Its county seat is Sioux Falls, South Dakota's most populous city. The county was created on April 5, 1862 and organized in 1868. Its name was derived from the Sioux word Mnihaha, meaning "rapid water," or "waterfall" (often incorrectly translated as "laughing water").

Minnehaha County is part of the Sioux Falls Metropolitan Statistical Area, the state's largest.

== Geography ==
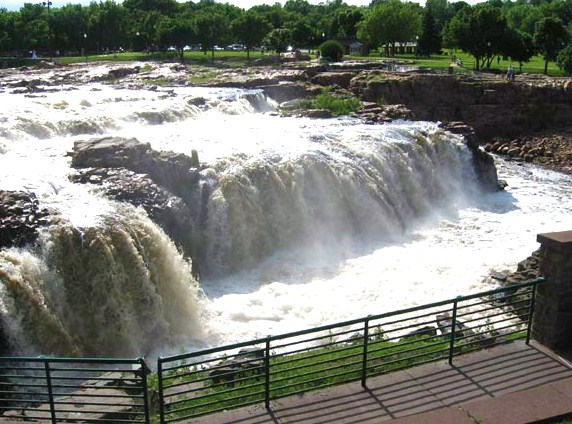
The falls of the Big Sioux River at Falls Park

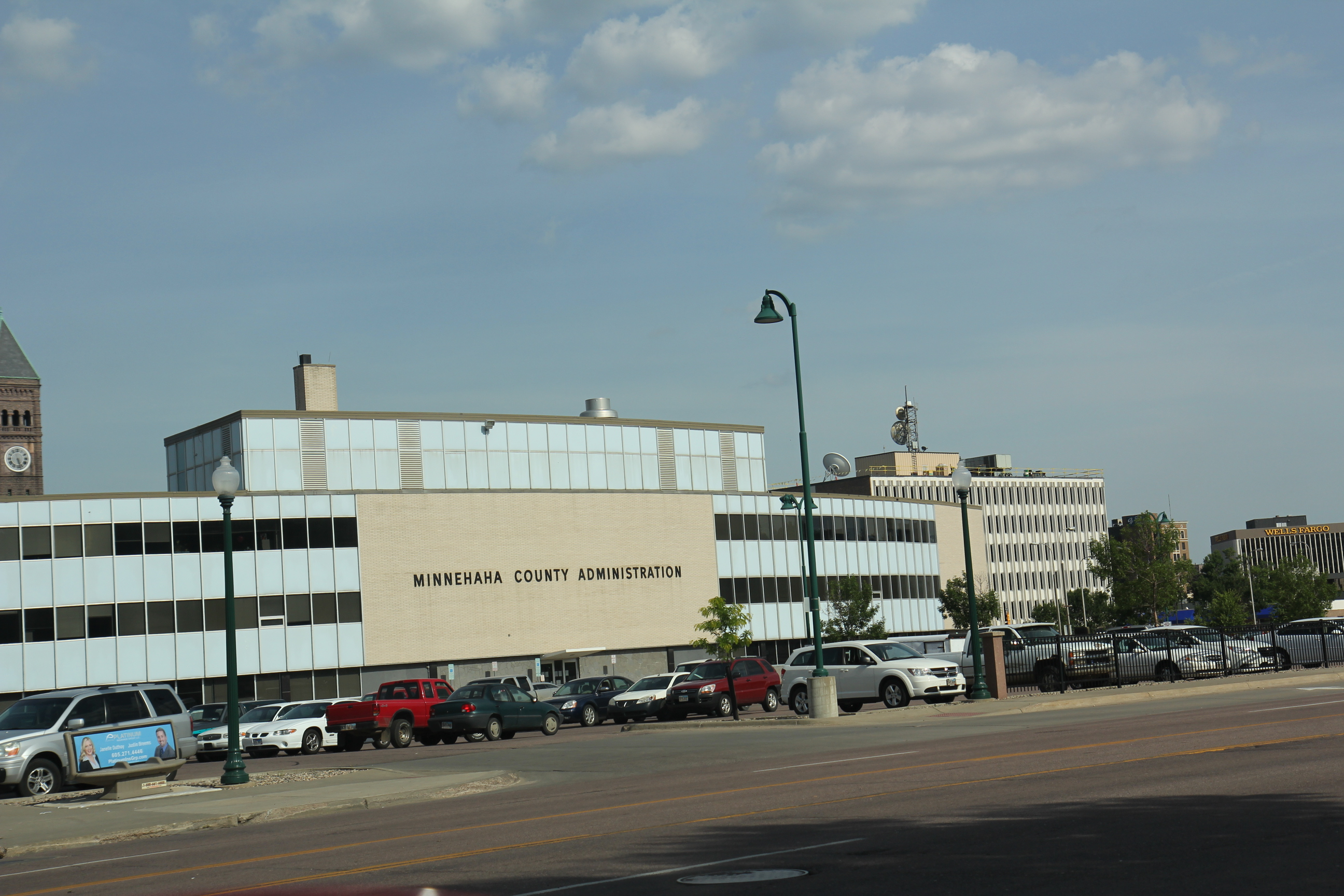
County Administration Building

Minnehaha County lies on the east side of South Dakota. Its eastern boundary abuts Minnesota as well as the northern and western boundaries of Iowa. The Big Sioux River flows south-southeast through the east central part of the county. Its terrain consists of rolling hills, devoted to agriculture except around built-up areas, and dotted with lakes and ponds in its western portion. Its terrain generally slopes southward, and the east and west edges slope to the river valley through the center of the county. Its highest point is in the northwest corner, at 1,752 ft (534 m) ASL.

According to the United States Census Bureau, the county has a total area of 813.861 square miles (2,107.89 km^{2}), of which 806.847 square miles (2,089.72 km^{2}) is land and 7.014 square miles (18.17 km^{2}) (0.9%) is water. It is the 13th largest county in South Dakota by total area.

=== Major highways ===
- I-29
- I-29 BL
- I-90
- I-90 BS
- I-229
- I-229 Downtown
- South Dakota Highway 11
- South Dakota Highway 19
- South Dakota Highway 38
- South Dakota Highway 42
- South Dakota Highway 115

=== Transit ===
- Jefferson Lines at Sioux Falls Bus Station
- Sioux Area Metro

=== Airports ===
- Sioux Falls Regional Airport (FSD)
- Wheelborg Landing Field, a small airport in Dell Rapids

=== Adjacent counties ===
- Moody County – north
- Pipestone County, Minnesota – northeast
- Rock County, Minnesota – east
- Lyon County, Iowa – southeast
- Lincoln County – south
- Turner County – southwest
- McCook County – west
- Lake County – northwest

=== Protected areas ===
- Beaver Creek State Recreation Area
- Big Sioux State Recreation Area
- Diamond Lake State Game Production Area
- Falls Park
- Island Lake State Game Production Area (part)
- Palisades State Park
- Pederson State Game Production Area
- Scott Lake State Game Production Area
- Twin Lakes State Game Production Area
- Wall Lake State Lakeside Use Area

=== Lakes, rivers and streams ===
- Beaver Creek
- Beaver Lake
- Big Sioux River
- Buffalo Lake
- Clear Lake
- Covell Lake
- Diamond Lake
- Fenstrman Slough
- Grass Lake
- Island Lake (partial)
- Lake Lorane
- Loss Lake
- Lost Lake
- Rehfeldt Slough
- Scott Lake
- Skunk Creek
- Split Rock Creek
- Twin Lake
- Wall Lake

== Demographics ==
Historical population
Census	Pop.	Note	%±
1870	355		—
1880	8,251		2,224.2%
1890	21,879		165.2%
1900	23,926		9.4%
1910	29,631		23.8%
1920	42,490		43.4%
1930	50,872		19.7%
1940	57,697		13.4%
1950	70,910		22.9%
1960	86,575		22.1%
1970	95,209		10.0%
1980	109,435		14.9%
1990	123,809		13.1%
2000	148,281		19.8%
2010	169,468		14.3%
2020	197,214		16.4%
2025 (est.)	212,691	▲	7.8%
U.S. Decennial Census; 1790–1960 1900–1990; 1990–2000 2010–2020

Minnehaha County, South Dakota – racial and ethnic composition
Note: the US Census treats Hispanic/Latino as an ethnic category. This table excludes Latinos from the racial categories and assigns them to a separate category. Hispanics/Latinos may be of any race.

Race / ethnicity (NH = non-Hispanic)	Pop. 1980	Pop. 1990	Pop. 2000	Pop. 2010	Pop. 2020
White alone (NH)	107,032 (97.80%)	120,047 (96.96%)	136,632 (92.14%)	146,159 (86.25%)	155,740 (78.97%)
Black or African American alone (NH)	268 (0.24%)	739 (0.60%)	2,217 (1.50%)	6,326 (3.73%)	11,411 (5.79%)
Native American or Alaska Native alone (NH)	1,118 (1.02%)	1,645 (1.33%)	2,678 (1.81%)	3,933 (2.32%)	4,807 (2.44%)
Asian alone (NH)	345 (0.32%)	689 (0.56%)	1,480 (1.00%)	2,489 (1.47%)	4,568 (2.32%)
Pacific Islander alone (NH)	—	—	55 (0.04%)	76 (0.04%)	71 (0.04%)
Other race alone (NH)	204 (0.19%)	41 (0.03%)	98 (0.07%)	189 (0.11%)	554 (0.28%)
Mixed race or multiracial (NH)	—	—	1,934 (1.30%)	3,314 (1.96%)	8,029 (4.07%)
Hispanic or Latino (any race)	468 (0.43%)	648 (0.52%)	3,187 (2.15%)	6,982 (4.12%)	12,034 (6.10%)
Total	109,435 (100.00%)	123,809 (100.00%)	148,281 (100.00%)	169,468 (100.00%)	197,214 (100.00%)

=== Recent estimates ===
As of the third quarter of 2024, the median home value in Minnehaha County was $305,100.

As of the 2023 American Community Survey, there are 82,394 estimated households in Minnehaha County with an average of 2.37 persons per household. The county has a median household income of $76,074. Approximately 9.7% of the county's population lives at or below the poverty line. Minnehaha County has an estimated 74.2% employment rate, with 34.6% of the population holding a bachelor's degree or higher and 93.1% holding a high school diploma.

The top five reported ancestries (people were allowed to report up to two ancestries, thus the figures will generally add to more than 100%) were English (87.2%), Spanish (5.6%), Indo-European (2.4%), Asian and Pacific Islander (1.4%), and Other (3.4%).

=== 2020 census ===
As of the 2020 census, there were 197,214 people, 78,715 households, and 48,690 families residing in the county.

Of the residents, 25.0% were under the age of 18 and 14.6% were 65 years of age or older; the median age was 35.9 years. For every 100 females there were 101.1 males, and for every 100 females age 18 and over there were 99.2 males. The population density was 244.4 inhabitants per square mile (94.4/km^{2}). There were 83,717 housing units at an average density of 103.8 per square mile (40.1/km^{2}). Of those units, 6.0% were vacant, 62.5% of occupied units were owner-occupied, and 37.5% were renter-occupied; the homeowner vacancy rate was 1.4% and the rental vacancy rate was 8.3%.

The racial makeup of the county was 80.3% White, 5.8% Black or African American, 2.7% American Indian and Alaska Native, 2.3% Asian, 2.9% from some other race, and 5.9% from two or more races. Hispanic or Latino residents of any race comprised 6.1% of the population.

Of the 78,715 households, 30.8% had children under the age of 18 living with them, 25.5% had a female householder with no spouse or partner present, 30.4% were made up of individuals, and 10.5% had someone living alone who was 65 years of age or older.

=== 2010 census ===
As of the 2010 census, there were 169,468 people, 67,028 households, and 42,052 families in the county. The population density was 210.0 inhabitants per square mile (81.1/km^{2}). There were 71,557 housing units at an average density of 88.7 per square mile (34.2/km^{2}). The racial makeup of the county was 88.05% White, 3.78% African American, 2.48% Native American, 1.48% Asian, 0.08% Pacific Islander, 1.84% from some other races and 2.29% from two or more races. Hispanic or Latino people of any race were 4.12% of the population. In terms of ancestry, 43.8% were German, 17.7% were Norwegian, 11.6% were Irish, 6.8% were Dutch, 6.3% were English, and 3.2% were American.

Of the 67,028 households, 32.7% had children under the age of 18 living with them, 47.7% were married couples living together, 10.5% had a female householder with no husband present, 37.3% were non-families, and 29.3% of all households were made up of individuals. The average household size was 2.43 and the average family size was 3.03. The median age was 34.5 years.

The median income for a household in the county was $51,799 and the median income for a family was $64,645. Males had a median income of $40,187 versus $31,517 for females. The per capita income for the county was $26,392. About 6.9% of families and 9.7% of the population were below the poverty line, including 12.2% of those under age 18 and 7.6% of those age 65 or over.

== Politics ==
Minnehaha is somewhat conservative for an urban county. Only four Democratic presidential candidates in five different elections have carried the county since 1940, and in only two of those elections did the Democrat obtained a majority of the county's vote.

In the South Dakota Legislature, Sioux Falls falls into Districts 9-15, with each district electing two Representatives and one Senator. Only two out of seven districts (10th and 15th) are represented by Democrats.

United States presidential election results for Minnehaha County, South Dakota
Year	Republican		Democratic		Third party(ies)	
Year	No.	%	No.	%	No.	%
1892	2,208	52.31%	484	11.47%	1,529	36.22%
1896	2,429	47.20%	2,667	51.83%	50	0.97%
1900	3,410	57.04%	2,440	40.82%	128	2.14%
1904	4,455	74.04%	1,046	17.38%	516	8.58%
1908	4,125	64.07%	1,948	30.26%	365	5.67%
1912	0	0.00%	2,576	42.38%	3,502	57.62%
1916	4,318	52.64%	3,494	42.59%	391	4.77%
1920	8,290	63.15%	2,534	19.30%	2,303	17.54%
1924	8,822	55.93%	1,524	9.66%	5,427	34.41%
1928	13,741	66.68%	6,805	33.02%	62	0.30%
1932	10,288	44.21%	12,646	54.34%	339	1.46%
1936	12,418	46.85%	13,174	49.70%	916	3.46%
1940	16,664	57.62%	12,259	42.38%	0	0.00%
1944	13,920	57.67%	10,216	42.33%	0	0.00%
1948	14,047	53.77%	11,770	45.05%	308	1.18%
1952	23,559	71.50%	9,390	28.50%	0	0.00%
1956	22,285	62.99%	13,093	37.01%	0	0.00%
1960	23,238	60.53%	15,152	39.47%	0	0.00%
1964	16,766	44.48%	20,929	55.52%	0	0.00%
1968	20,141	53.31%	16,462	43.57%	1,177	3.12%
1972	22,447	49.90%	22,386	49.76%	155	0.34%
1976	23,286	51.12%	22,068	48.44%	202	0.44%
1980	26,256	51.00%	20,008	38.87%	5,214	10.13%
1984	29,908	56.25%	23,042	43.34%	221	0.42%
1988	26,765	47.71%	29,135	51.94%	195	0.35%
1992	25,081	39.32%	27,016	42.35%	11,689	18.33%
1996	27,432	44.24%	29,790	48.05%	4,782	7.71%
2000	33,428	54.47%	27,042	44.06%	899	1.46%
2004	44,189	56.92%	32,314	41.62%	1,129	1.45%
2008	39,251	48.73%	39,838	49.46%	1,463	1.82%
2012	40,342	52.68%	34,674	45.28%	1,567	2.05%
2016	42,043	53.72%	30,610	39.11%	5,610	7.17%
2020	49,249	53.34%	40,482	43.85%	2,595	2.81%
2024	51,842	55.16%	39,923	42.48%	2,221	2.36%

== Communities ==
=== Cities ===
- Baltic
- Brandon
- Colton
- Crooks
- Dell Rapids
- Garretson
- Hartford
- Sioux Falls (county seat and largest community; small portion extends to Lincoln County)
- Valley Springs

=== Towns ===
- Humboldt
- Sherman

=== Census-designated places ===
- Anderson
- Lyons
- Meadow View Addition
- Pine Lakes Addition
- Renner Corner
- Rowena

=== Unincorporated communities ===
- Andy's Acres
- Benclare
- Booge
- Corson
- Ellis
- Huntimer
- Midway
- Morefield
- Renner

=== Townships ===
- Benton
- Brandon
- Buffalo
- Burk
- Clear Lake
- Dell Rapids
- Edison
- Grand Meadow
- Hartford
- Highland
- Humboldt
- Logan
- Lyons
- Mapleton
- Palisade
- Red Rock
- Sioux Falls
- Split Rock
- Sverdrup
- Taopi
- Valley Springs
- Wall Lake
- Wayne
- Wellington

=== Historical townsites ===
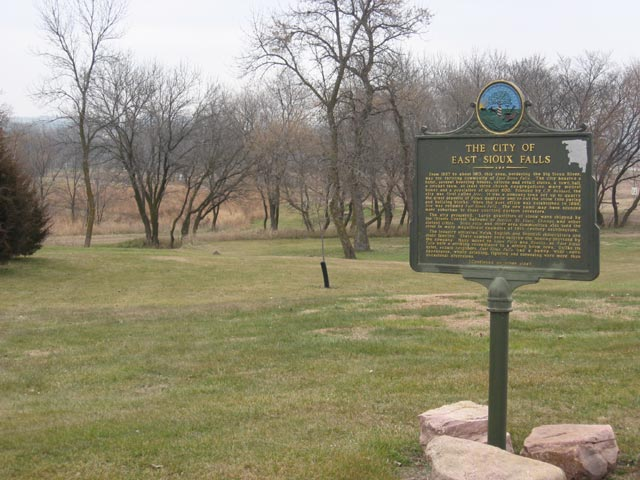
Sign marking the site of the former town of East Sioux Falls

- East Sioux Falls
- Eminija
- South Sioux Falls
- West Sioux Falls
- Wingert

== Education ==
School districts in the county include:

- Baltic School District 49-1
- Brandon Valley School District 49-2
- Canton School District 41-1
- Chester School District 39-1
- Dell Rapids School District 49-3
- Garretson School District 49-4
- Harrisburg School District 41-2
- Lennox School District 41-4
- Montrose School District 43-2
- Parker School District 60-4
- Sioux Falls School District 49-5
- Tea Area School District 41-5
- Tri-Valley School District 49-6
- West Central School District 49-7

Various rural schools operated in the county's history.

== See also ==
- National Register of Historic Places listings in Minnehaha County, South Dakota
