= Edison Township, Minnehaha County, South Dakota =

Edison Township, South Dakota
- Township
- Location within South Dakota
- Coordinates: 43°43′03″N 96°35′29″W
- Country: United States
- State: South Dakota
- Counties: Minnehaha

Area
  - Total: 36.14 sq mi (93.59 km^{2})
  - Land: 36.04 sq mi (93.35 km^{2})
  - Water: 0.093 sq mi (0.24 km^{2})
- Elevation: 1,470 ft (450 m)

Population (2020)
  - Total: 545
  - Density: 15.1/sq mi (5.84/km^{2})
- Time zone: UTC-6 (Central (CST))
  - Summer (DST): UTC-5 (CDT)
- Area code: 605
- FIPS code: 46-18380
- GNIS feature ID: 1267938

Edison Township is a township in Minnehaha County, South Dakota, United States. The population was 545 at the 2020 census.

== Geography ==
Edison Township has a total area of 36.136 square miles (93.59 km^{2}), of which 36.044 square miles (93.35 km^{2}) is land and 0.092 square miles (0.24 km^{2}) is water.

=== Major highways ===
- South Dakota Highway 11

== Demographics ==
As of the 2023 American Community Survey, there were an estimated 119 households.
