= Sixmile Creek (South Dakota) =

Coordinates: 44°17′32″N 96°50′55″W

Sixmile Creek is a tributary of the Big Sioux River, located in Brookings County, South Dakota, United States.

Sixmile Creek runs about 28 miles (45 km) in length and intersects the western region of Brookings, where it terminates about 0.12 mi (200 m) north of the city. As of May 2024, the city of Brookings is studying flood mitigation for the Sixmile Creek corridor.

== See also ==
- List of rivers of South Dakota
