= Big Sioux Recreation Area =

State recreation area in South Dakota, United States

- Location within South Dakota
- Interactive map of Big Sioux Recreation Area
- Location: Minnehaha County, South Dakota, United States
- Coordinates: 43°34′23″N 96°35′40″W
- Area: 430 acres (170 ha)
- Established: 1978
- Administrator: South Dakota Department of Game, Fish and Parks
- Website: Official website

Big Sioux Recreation Area is a South Dakota state recreation area in Minnehaha County, South Dakota in the United States. The recreation area is named for the Big Sioux River which flows through the park. The recreation area is located 4 miles east of Sioux Falls and is very popular for camping, cabin rentals, canoeing, biking, hiking, disc golf, snowmobiling and archery.

== Description ==
The park is known for its large bur oak, eastern cottonwood, box elder and silver maple trees. There are over 7 miles of walking trails at the park. There is a 2.5-mile paved bike trail that connects with the city of Brandon bike trail. The Prairie Vista Trail is a horseback riding and mountain bike trail that is over 2 miles long. The Jay Heath Canoe and Kayak Trail goes through the park via the Big Sioux River.

The park is located in the southern section of the Coteau des Prairies land formation. Rolling hills are very common in the Coteau des Prairies. Big Sioux Recreation Area has a large hill located on the west side of the park that offers great views of the park as well as the city of the Brandon, South Dakota. The Prairie Vista Trail goes up to the summit of this hill.

Just like other areas along the Big Sioux River corridor, there are 200 different kinds of bird species that will migrate through and near the park. Bald eagles are common to see during the winter months. Deer, turkeys, coyotes, snapping turtles and woodchucks can be found in some of the remote areas of the park. River otters can sometimes be found in secluded areas along the Big Sioux River. Catfish can be found throughout the Big Sioux River.

The March 2019 North American blizzard caused severe flooding at the park. This weather event brought heavy rainfall that melted ground snow rapidly while the ground was still frozen. Heavy snow amounts were found upstream in the Big Sioux River drainage basin, which melted and intensified the flood event. Later on in September 2019 the park experienced historic flooding that was caused from excess rain in the area as well as areas upstream of the park. These events may be caused by the effects of Climate change in South Dakota. See 2019 Midwestern U.S. floods for more information.

A log cabin that was built in 1869 by Norwegian immigrants can be found at the park. The timber for the cabin came from the forests along the Big Sioux River.

== See also ==
- List of South Dakota state parks
