= Anderson, South Dakota =

- Unincorporated community
- Location within South Dakota Location within the United States
- Coordinates: 43°31′04″N 96°37′20″W
- Country: United States
- State: South Dakota
- County: Minnehaha

Area
  - Total: 0.76 sq mi (1.98 km^{2})
  - Land: 0.76 sq mi (1.98 km^{2})
  - Water: 0 sq mi (0.00 km^{2})
- Elevation: 1,450 ft (440 m)

Population (2020)
  - Total: 388
  - Density: 506.8/sq mi (195.68/km^{2})
- Time zone: UTC-6 (Central (CST))
  - Summer (DST): UTC-5 (CDT)
- Area code: 605
- GNIS feature ID: 2584543

Anderson, also known as Anderson Subdivision, is an unincorporated community and census-designated place in Minnehaha County, South Dakota, United States. Its population was 388 as of the 2020 census. The community is east of Sioux Falls.

== Geography ==
According to the U.S. Census Bureau, the community has an area of 0.987 square miles (2.56 km^{2}); 0.980 square miles (2.54 km^{2}) of its area is land, and 0.007 square miles (0.018 km^{2}) is water.

== Demographics ==
Historical population
Census	Pop.	Note	%±
2020	388		—
U.S. Decennial Census
