= Beaver Creek (Split Rock Creek tributary) =

Stream in South Dakota, U.S.

Coordinates: 43°33′31″N 96°35′13″W

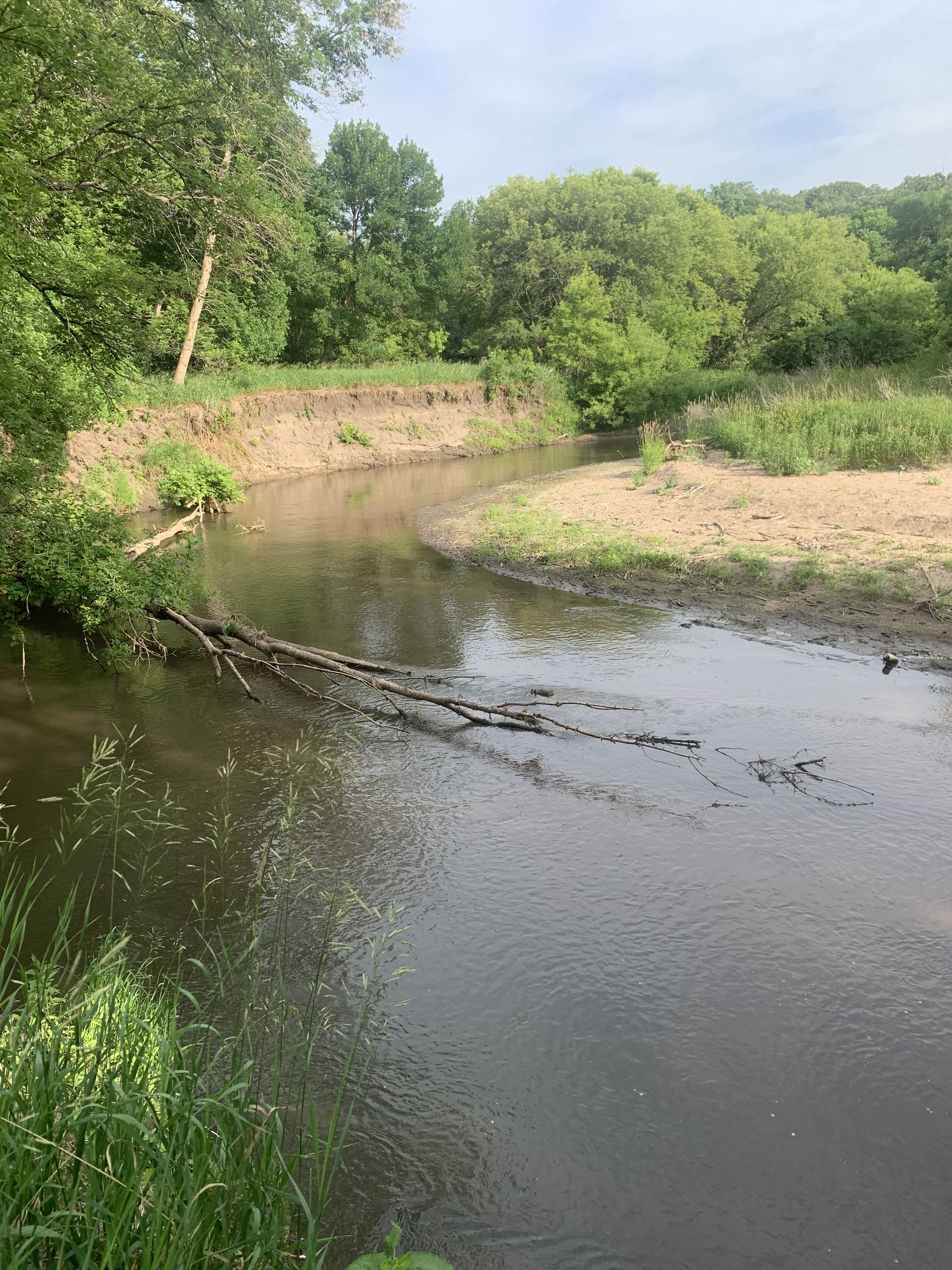
Beaver Creek as it flows along the southern border of Beaver Creek Nature Area

Beaver Creek is a stream in Rock County, Minnesota and Minnehaha County, South Dakota. It is a tributary of Split Rock Creek.

Beaver Creek was named from the fact early settlers saw beaver dams in the stream.

== See also ==
- List of rivers of Minnesota
- List of rivers of South Dakota
