= Skunk Creek (South Dakota) =

River in the United States

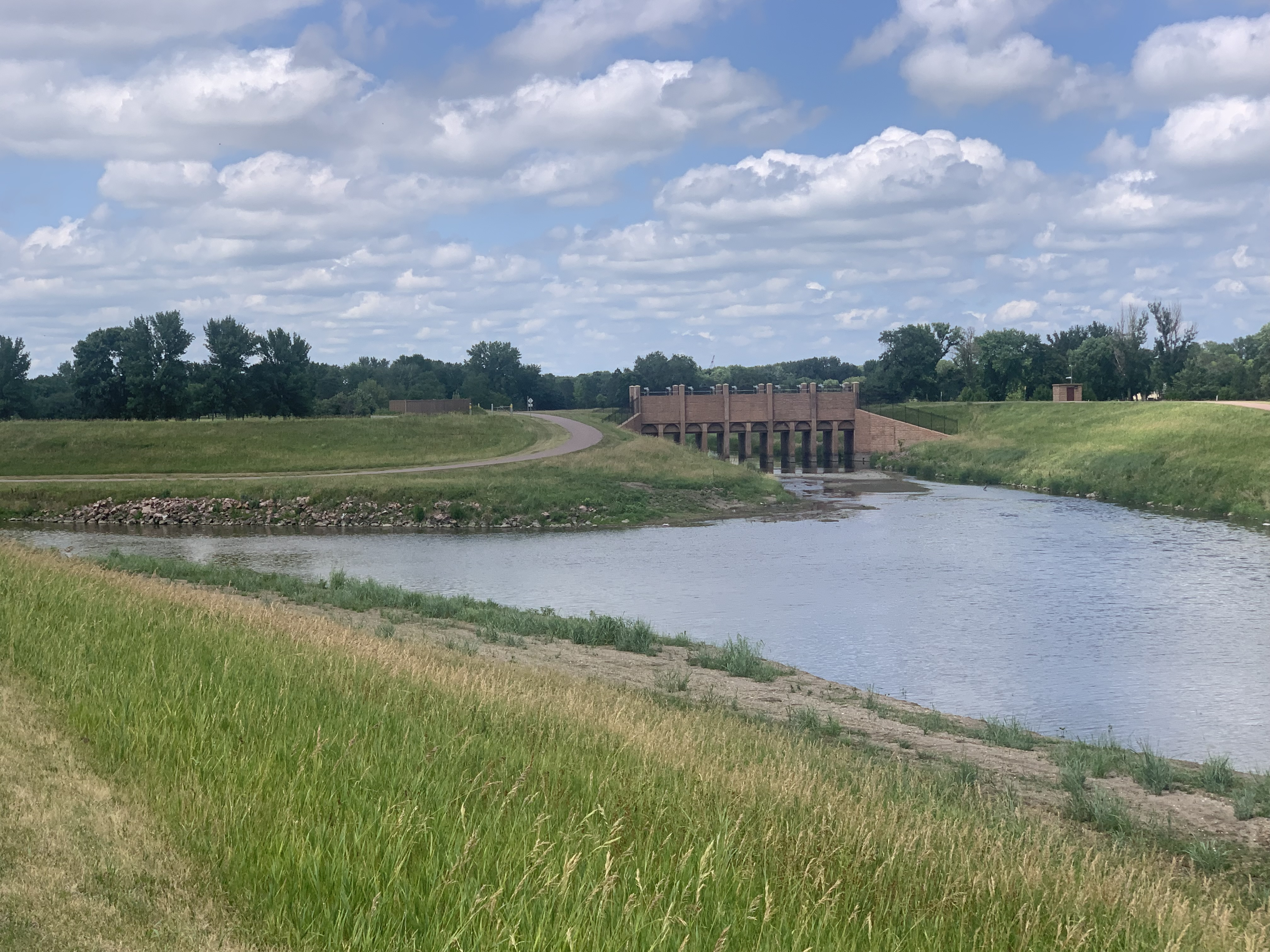
- Confluence of Skunk Creek (left) and Big Sioux River (right) in Sioux Falls, South Dakota

Location
- Country: United States

Physical characteristics
- Source
  - location: Brant Lake, Lake County, South Dakota
  - coordinates: 43°55′12″N 96°57′47″W
- Mouth
  - location: Sioux Falls, South Dakota
  - coordinates: 43°31′34″N 96°46′16″W

Skunk Creek is a tributary of the Big Sioux River, located in the southeastern South Dakota counties of Lake, Moody, and Minnehaha. It has a confluence with the Big Sioux in the west central area of Sioux Falls.

Skunk Creek was a natural habitat of skunks, hence the name.

== See also ==
- List of rivers of South Dakota
