= Brandon Valley Performing Arts Center =

Coordinates: 43.592262°N 96.574115°W

Brandon Valley Performing Arts Center is a performing arts center in Brandon, South Dakota. The Center was opened in the fall of 1999 and seats a 800 people. It is owned and operated by the Brandon Valley School District, and is used for local concerts for every grade level, high school play productions, and area professional and amateur theatrical productions.

The BVPAC is also has been home to the South Dakota One Act State Festival in previous years.
