= Pine Lakes Addition, South Dakota =

- Unincorporated community
- Location within South Dakota Location within the United States
- Coordinates: 43°33′04″N 96°38′08″W
- Country: United States
- State: South Dakota
- County: Minnehaha

Area
  - Total: 0.18 sq mi (0.46 km^{2})
  - Land: 0.18 sq mi (0.46 km^{2})
  - Water: 0 sq mi (0.00 km^{2})
- Elevation: 1,404 ft (428 m)

Population (2020)
  - Total: 306
  - Density: 1,738.4/sq mi (671.21/km^{2})
- Time zone: UTC-6 (Central (CST))
  - Summer (DST): UTC-5 (CDT)
- Area code: 605
- GNIS feature ID: 2584565

Pine Lakes Addition is an unincorporated community and census-designated place in Minnehaha County, South Dakota, United States. Its population was 306 as of the 2020 census. The community is east of Sioux Falls.

== Geography ==
According to the U.S. Census Bureau, the community has an area of 0.192 square miles (0.50 km^{2}), all land.

== Demographics ==
Historical population
Census	Pop.	Note	%±
2020	306		—
U.S. Decennial Census
