= Beaver Creek Nature Area =

Nature area in South Dakota

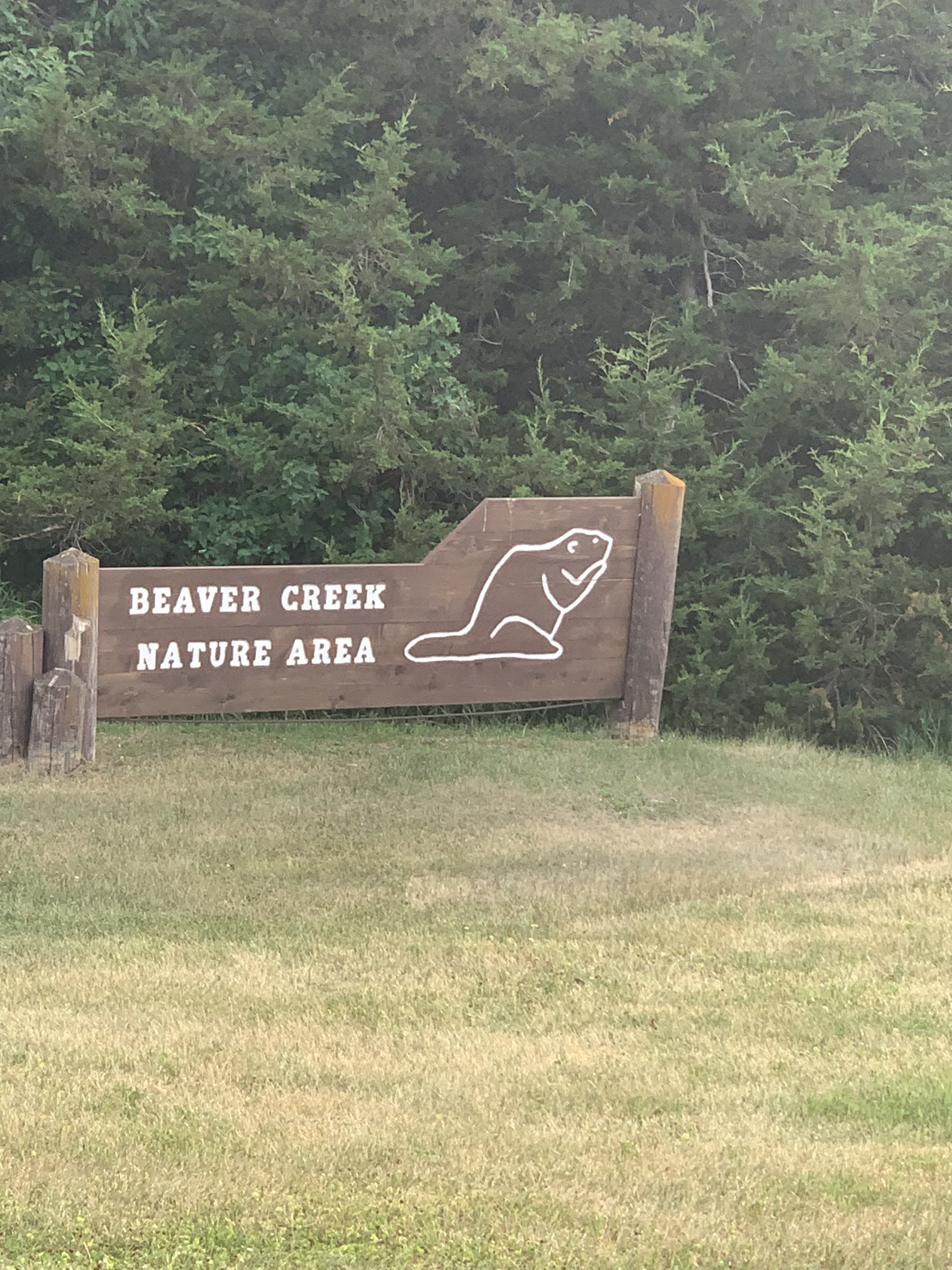

- Location within South Dakota
- Location: Minnehaha County, South Dakota, United States
- Coordinates: 43°33′29″N 96°32′30″W
- Area: 165 acres (67 ha)
- Established: 1967
- Administrator: South Dakota Department of Game, Fish and Parks
- Website: Official website

Beaver Creek Nature Area is a nature area in Minnehaha County, South Dakota in the United States. It is located along Beaver Creek, a tributary of Split Rock Creek, just east of Sioux Falls. Birdwatching, fishing, hiking, and snowmobiling are popular activities within this area. Wildlife found in the area include: Bald eagle, White-tailed deer, Coyote, Beaver, and many song birds and waterfowl.

== Gallery ==
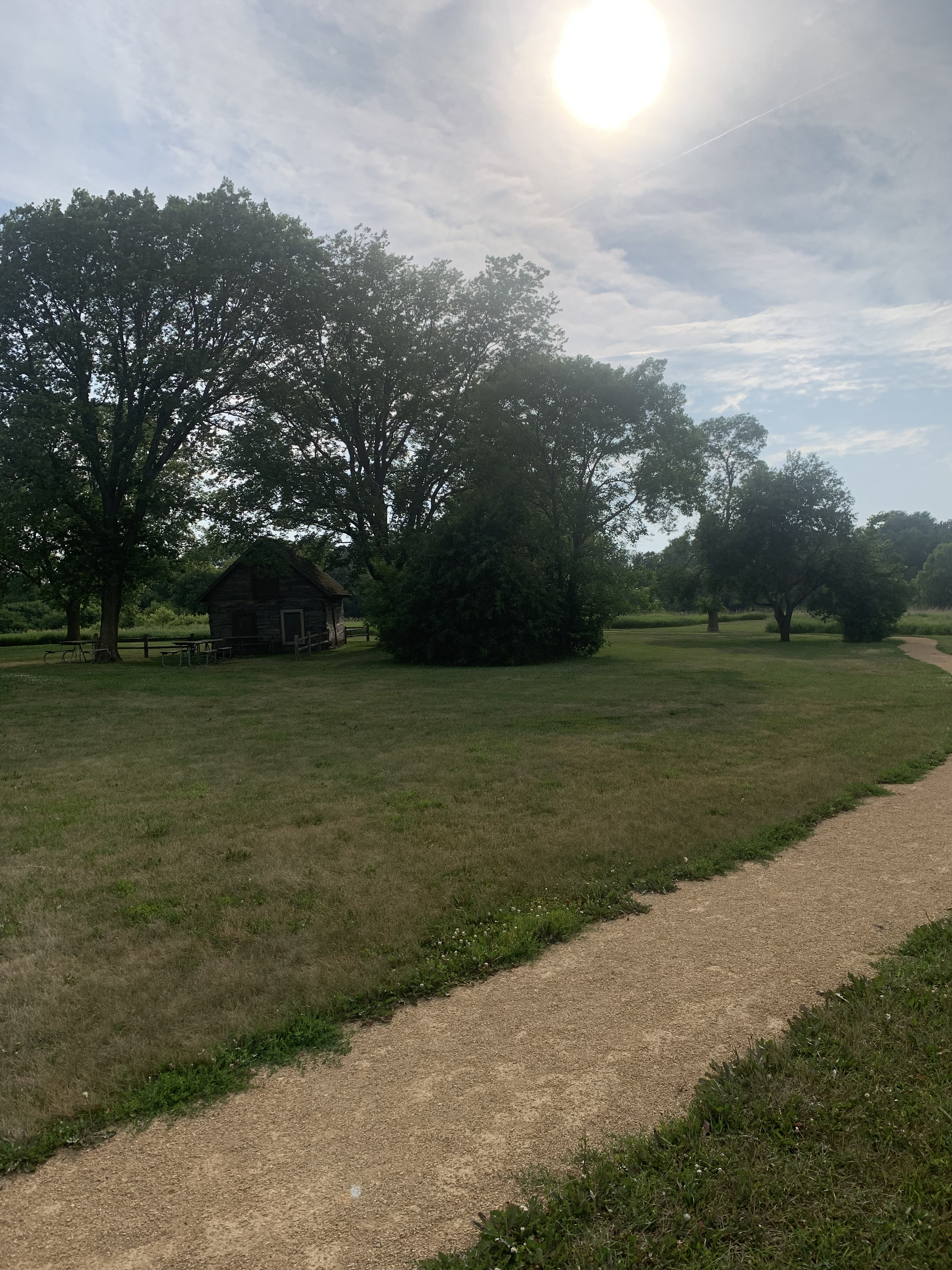
Samuelson Homestead at Beaver Creek Nature Area

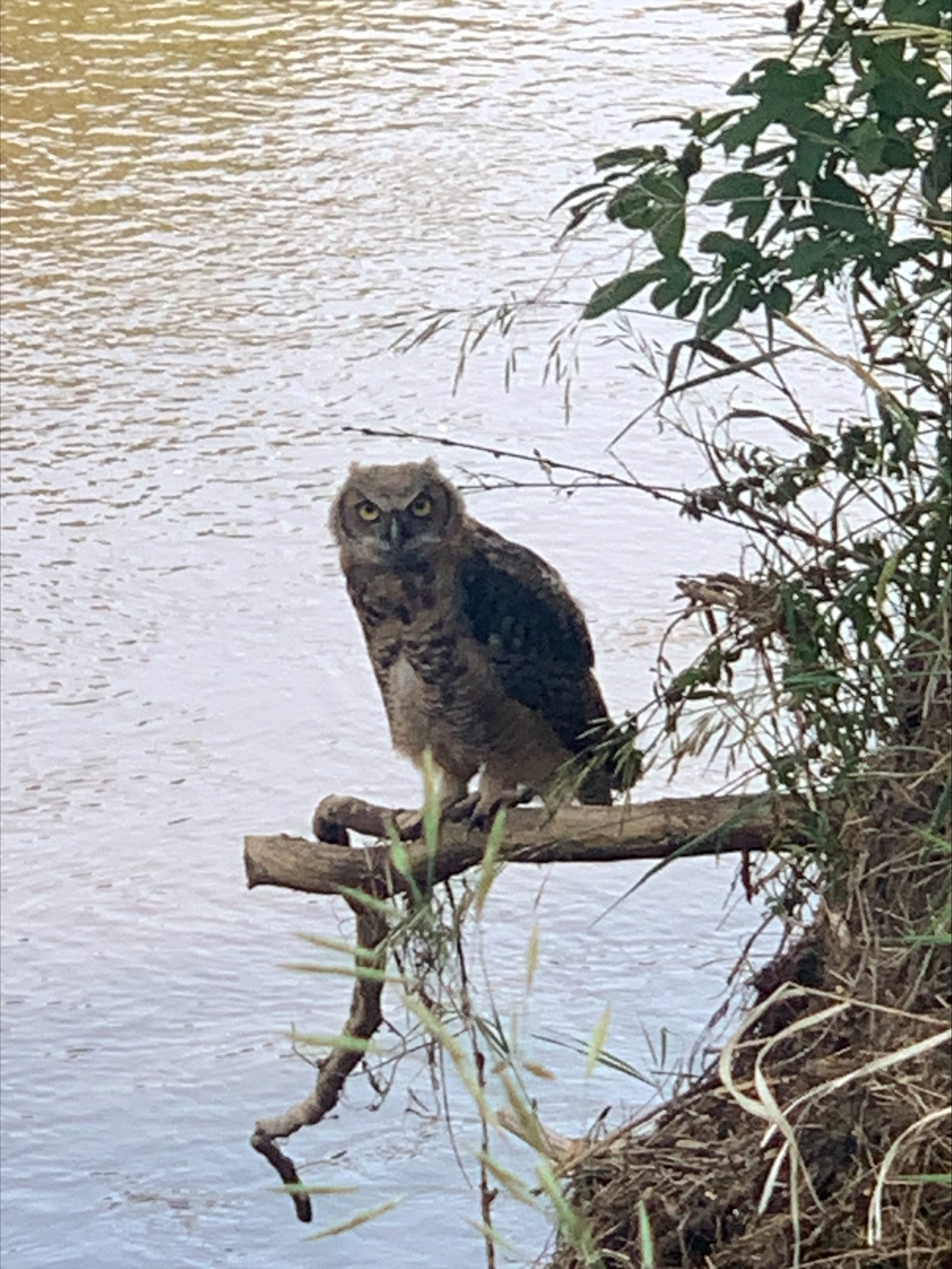
Owl perches over Beaver Creek at Beaver Creek Nature Area

== See also ==
- List of South Dakota state parks
