= Peg Munky Run =

River in South Dakota, United States

Coordinates: 44°31′28″N 96°52′47″W

Peg Munky Run is a tributary of the Big Sioux River, located in the counties of Deuel and Brookings in South Dakota, United States.

Peg Munky Run is a corruption of its original name "Pee Munky Run".

== See also ==
- List of rivers of South Dakota
