= Renner Corner, South Dakota =

- Unincorporated community
- Location within South Dakota Location within the United States
- Coordinates: 43°39′09″N 96°42′16″W
- Country: United States
- State: South Dakota
- County: Minnehaha

Area
  - Total: 1.29 sq mi (3.34 km^{2})
  - Land: 1.29 sq mi (3.33 km^{2})
  - Water: 0.0039 sq mi (0.01 km^{2})
- Elevation: 1,483 ft (452 m)

Population (2020)
  - Total: 347
  - Density: 269.7/sq mi (104.13/km^{2})
- Time zone: UTC-6 (Central (CST))
  - Summer (DST): UTC-5 (CDT)
- Area code: 605
- GNIS feature ID: 2584567

Renner Corner is an unincorporated community and census-designated place in Minnehaha County, South Dakota, United States. Its population was 347 as of the 2020 census. The community is located along South Dakota Highway 115, north of Sioux Falls.

== Geography ==
According to the U.S. Census Bureau, the community has an area of 1.289 square miles (3.34 km^{2}); 1.287 square miles (3.33 km^{2}) of its area is land, and 0.002 square miles (0.0052 km^{2}) is water.

== Demographics ==
Historical population
Census	Pop.	Note	%±
2020	347		—
U.S. Decennial Census
