= Meadow View Addition, South Dakota =

- Unincorporated community
- Location within South Dakota Location within the United States
- Coordinates: 43°37′24″N 96°42′08″W
- Country: United States
- State: South Dakota
- County: Minnehaha

Area
  - Total: 1.08 sq mi (2.80 km^{2})
  - Land: 1.08 sq mi (2.80 km^{2})
  - Water: 0 sq mi (0.00 km^{2})
- Elevation: 1,483 ft (452 m)

Population (2020)
  - Total: 531
  - Density: 491.0/sq mi (189.58/km^{2})
- Time zone: UTC-6 (Central (CST))
  - Summer (DST): UTC-5 (CDT)
- Area code: 605
- GNIS feature ID: 2584560

Meadow View Addition is an unincorporated community and census-designated place in Minnehaha County, South Dakota, United States. Its population was 531 as of the 2020 census. The community is located on South Dakota Highway 115, north of Sioux Falls.

== Geography ==
According to the U.S. Census Bureau, the community has an area of 1.085 square miles (2.81 km^{2}); 1.084 square miles (2.81 km^{2}) of its area is land, and 0.001 square miles (0.0026 km^{2}) is water.

== Demographics ==
Historical population
Census	Pop.	Note	%±
2020	531		—
U.S. Decennial Census
