= Lost Lake (South Dakota) =

Lake in the state of South Dakota, United States

- Location within South Dakota Location within the United States
- Location: Minnehaha County, South Dakota
- Coordinates: 43°40′53″N 97°03′29″W
- Basin countries: United States
- Surface area: 163 acres (66 ha)
- Max. depth: 7 ft (2.1 m)
- Surface elevation: 1,667 ft (508 m)

Lost Lake is located in Minnehaha County, South Dakota, United States. The lake lies 2 miles (3.2 km) north of Humboldt.

== History ==
Lost Lake was given its name because the surrounding hills hid the lake so well. The hills rendered the lake virtually invisible until the shores were reached.

== See also ==
- List of South Dakota lakes
- List of lakes
