= Benton Township, Minnehaha County, South Dakota =

Benton Township, South Dakota
- Township
- Location within South Dakota
- Coordinates: 43°37′51″N 96°49′52″W
- Country: United States
- State: South Dakota
- County: Minnehaha

Area
  - Total: 31.36 sq mi (81.21 km^{2})
  - Land: 31.34 sq mi (81.18 km^{2})
  - Water: 0.014 sq mi (0.036 km^{2})
- Elevation: 1,558 ft (475 m)

Population (2020)
  - Total: 778
  - Density: 24.8/sq mi (9.58/km^{2})
- Time zone: UTC-6 (Central (CST))
  - Summer (DST): UTC-5 (CDT)
- Area code: 605
- FIPS code: 46-04860
- GNIS feature ID: 1267932

Benton Township is a township in Minnehaha County, South Dakota, United States. The population was 778 at the 2020 census.

== Geography ==
Benton Township has a total area of 31.357 square miles (81.21 km^{2}), of which 31.343 square miles (81.18 km^{2}) is land and 0.014 square miles (0.036 km^{2}) is water.

=== Major highways ===
- I-29
- I-90
- South Dakota Highway 38

== Demographics ==
As of the 2023 American Community Survey, there were an estimated 285 households.
