= Humboldt Township, Minnehaha County, South Dakota =

Township in Minnehaha County, South Dakota

Coordinates: 43°38′40″N 97°4′30″W

Humboldt Township is a township in Minnehaha County, in the U.S. state of South Dakota.

Humboldt, South Dakota, is the town in Humboldt township.

== History ==
Humboldt Township was named for Alexander von Humboldt, a German scientist and writer.
