= Booge, South Dakota =

Unincorporated community in South Dakota, US

Booge is an unincorporated community in Red Rock Township, Minnehaha County, South Dakota, United States. The community sits on a major route of the Burlington Northern and Santa Fe Railway, and it is a halfway point between Garretson, South Dakota and Manley, Minnesota.

== Geography ==
Booge is located at 43°38′45″N 96°27′36″W. Booge sits 2 1/2 miles (4.0 km) north of Interstate 90 on the Minnesota border on County Road 130 (CR 130) and one mile (1.6 km) west of Minnesota State Highway 23.

== History ==
Booge was named after C. A. Booge, an official of the Sioux City and Northern Railroad Company on January 21, 1891. Booge was responsible for getting the railroad line extended into South Dakota.
