= Sioux Falls Bus Station =

Intercity bus station in Sioux Falls, South Dakota

General information
- Location: 4110 Maple Street, Suite 108, Sioux Falls, South Dakota
- Coordinates: 43.573382°N 96.780333°W
- Bus operators: Jefferson Lines
- Connections: Sioux Area Metro 19

Other information
- Website: Official website

History
- Opened: 2010s

Passengers
- 10,000/month (2005)
Location

The Sioux Falls Bus Station is an intercity bus station on the west side of Sioux Falls, South Dakota. The station, opened in the mid-2010s, serves Jefferson Lines buses to destinations across the Upper Midwest.

Sioux Falls has seen intercity bus transit since 1921, and the first bus station opened on Phillips Avenue in 1924. Two new bus stations opened in 1947, one of which would be in operation until the early 2000s. This was followed by the bus station on Russell Street, which opened in 2005 and the current station approximately a decade later on Maple Street.

== Attributes ==
The bus station is located west of downtown Sioux Falls on the west side of Interstate 29. The terminal occupies the westernmost doorway of a building serving multiple businesses. The bus station is used solely by Jefferson Lines.

== History ==
=== Early stations ===
The first intercity bus station in Sioux Falls was the Union Bus Depot, which opened September 2, 1924 at 234 North Phillips Avenue. By 1927, this depot had 18 departures and 18 arrivals per day with 400 passengers traveling through the Sioux Falls station. Service was provided by Jack Rabbit Transportation Co., Worthington-Sioux Falls Transportation Co., 3-R and Custer Transportation Co., Blue Goose Transportation Co., Groves Transportation Co., and Sioux Falls Traction System.

In 1947 two new bus stations opened to replace the Union Bus Depot. On May 1, the First Avenue Depot opened between 11th and 12th streets, serving Sioux Lines Inc., Hawkeye Stages, and Two Siouxs Bus Lines. August 20 saw the opening of the new Union Bus Depot at 301 North Dakota Avenue. This station, managed by Jack Rabbit Lines, saw the majority of bus traffic serving the additional bus operators of Overland Greyhound Co., Palace City Lines, Southwestern Stages, and Sioux Falls-Springfield Lines. The $70,000 Union Bus Depot featured seven bus bays, an indoor waiting area, ticket office, and restaurant.

=== Recent history ===
While the First Avenue Depot closed earlier, the 1947 Union Bus Depot continued on until early 2005, when it too was demolished to make way for a post office and office building. Jefferson Lines moved temporarily to 610 East 54th Street, until the new depot was completed November 21, 2005. The new station at 1500 West Russell Street, away from downtown, was hailed for its clean, modern look with an internet cafe and snack shop. While Jefferson Lines is the sole bus company serving the terminal, the new facility was completely paid for by the local businessman Ian Cross. Cross, the owner of Cross Courier & Dispatch Services, served as ticket agent for Jefferson Lines at the new station. In the mid-2010s, Jefferson Lines moved down the road to a location off Interstate 29 at 4410 Maple Street.

== See also ==
- Sioux Area Metro
