= Great Bear Recreation Park =

Ski area in South Dakota, United States

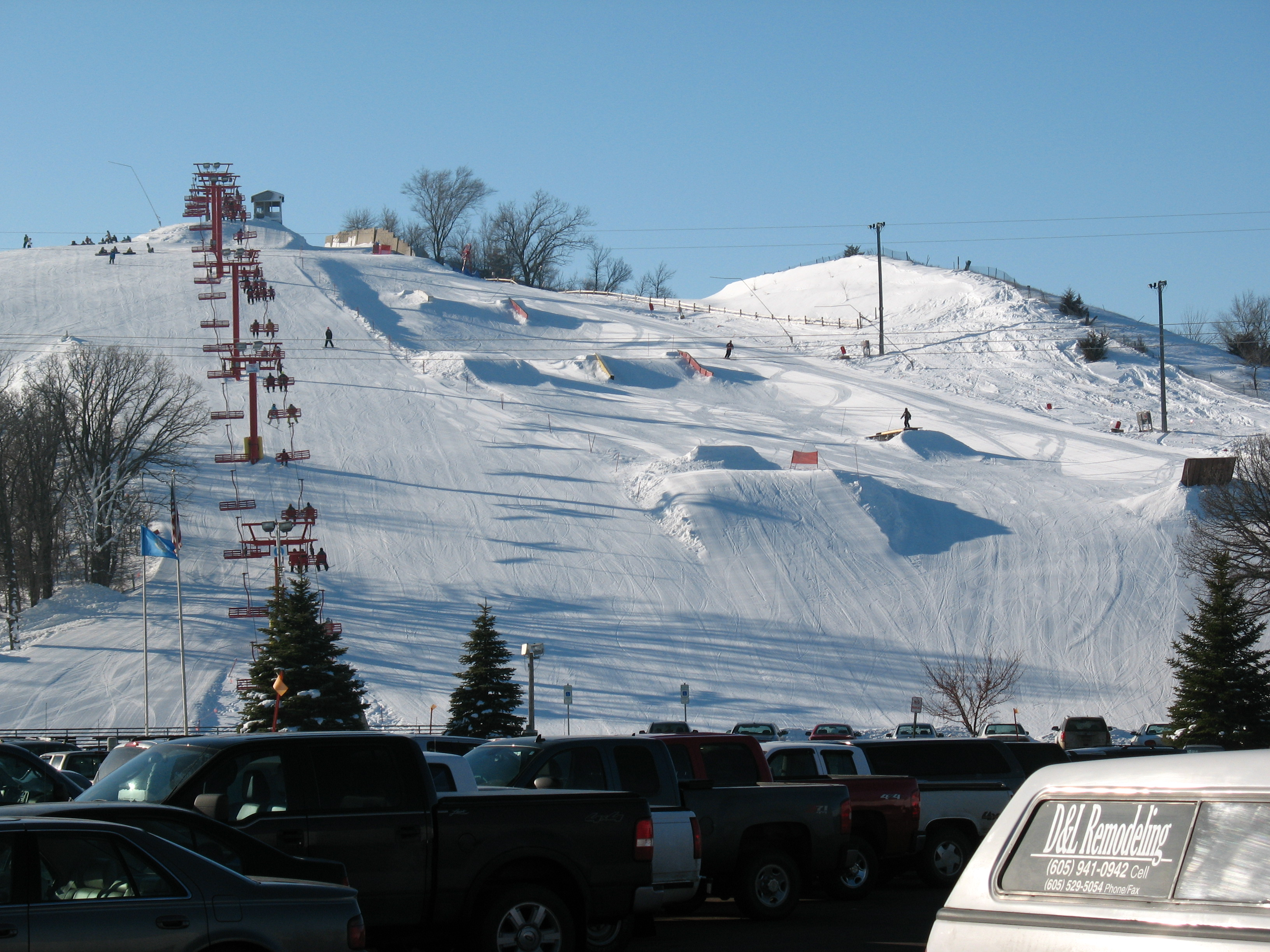
- Interactive map of Great Bear Recreation Park
- Location: Sioux Falls, South Dakota, USA
- Nearest city: Sioux Falls (6 miles NE of downtown)
- Coordinates: 43°34′55.56″N 96°39′53.88″W
- Vertical: 178 feet (54 m)
- Top elevation: 1,530 feet (470 m)
- Base elevation: 1,352 feet (412 m)
- Trails: 14 total
- Lift system: 4 total
- Terrain parks: 1 total
- Website: https://www.greatbearpark.com

Great Bear Recreation Park, more commonly referred to as Great Bear, is a year-round recreation and conservation area in the northeastern section of Sioux Falls, South Dakota, United States offering trails and winter sports. It is owned by the City of Sioux Falls and co-managed by Great Bear Recreation Park Inc.

== History ==
Great Bear Ski Area was established in 1966 by Ron Clifford and later sold to Dennis Finke and Jerry Dirks in 1969. Great Bear started out as an old gravel pit with one rope tow and two runs. One longer run to the left of the rope tow and one shorter run to the right. Finke and Dirks built the first chalet at the ski area. In the early days Great Bear was open Thursday, Friday, Saturday and Sunday expanding hours in the 1970s to every day. By the early 1970s Great Bear had expanded to three rope tows and seven runs.

Great Bear began expanding into a year-round recreation park in the summer of 1998. The renovation of the Chalet at Great Bear was completed December 2001 and offers a 270-degree panoramic view of the surrounding area. The 2002 completion of the Ralph and Doris Wallin Nature Trail System marked the completion of the Great Bear Expansion Project and officially opened the park to four-season use.

== Facilities ==
Great Bear Ski Valley, eastern South Dakota's largest ski resort, features over 220 acres of outdoor fun just minutes from downtown Sioux Falls. In the winter, the park features 14 downhill ski trails with 3 lifts (quad chairlift, magic carpet, and handle tow) and a terrain park. The Kirby Family Tubing Park has 8 to 12 lanes with a magic carpet lift. Both the ski and tubing hills have snowmaking. The park also has 4 miles of cross country and snow shoeing trails that provide. Great Bear offers lessons and complete equipment rentals.

The park also features a chalet offering a selection of food and beverage and ample seating. Great Bear does not offer onsite lodging.

In the summer, The Ralph and Doris Wallin Nature trail system, nearly 4 miles of trails, provides 3 distinct trail loops through hills and valleys with scenic views. Bicycling is not allowed on the trails. The lodge is also rented out for private events during the spring, summer and fall months including company retreats and weddings.
