= Lyons Township, Minnehaha County, South Dakota =

Township in Minnehaha County, South Dakota

Coordinates: 43°43′03″N 96°49′52″W

Lyons Township is a township in Minnehaha County, in the U.S. state of South Dakota.

== History ==
Lyons Township most likely has the name of a pioneer settler.
