= Split Rock Creek State Park =

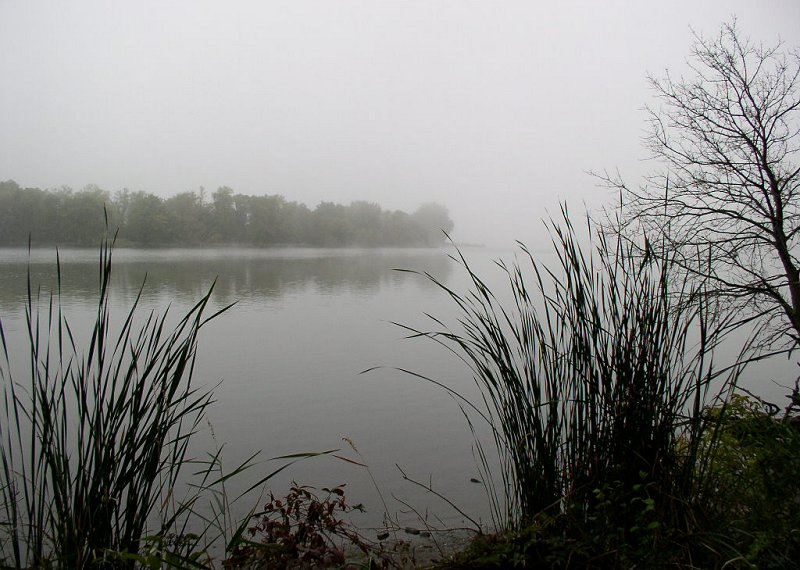

- Location within Minnesota Location within the United States
- Location: Pipestone, Minnesota, United States
- Coordinates: 43°53′52″N 96°21′51″W
- Area: 1,303 acres (5.27 km^{2})
- Elevation: 1,624 ft (495 m)
- Established: 1937
- Governing body: Minnesota Department of Natural Resources
- Yes

Split Rock Creek State Park is a state park of Minnesota, United States, located in Ihlen, or just south of Pipestone.

The Works Progress Administration built a dam in 1938 to create a lake, which provided an opportunity for water recreation in an area of the state with few natural lakes. The dam was constructed of Sioux Quartzite, a hard red rock widely found in the area. A nearby bridge, Split Rock Creek Bridge, was also built by the WPA of Sioux quartzite in 1938. The bridge carries County Road 54 over the creek. It is listed on the National Register of Historic Places as part of the Minnesota Masonry-Arch Highway Bridges MPS.

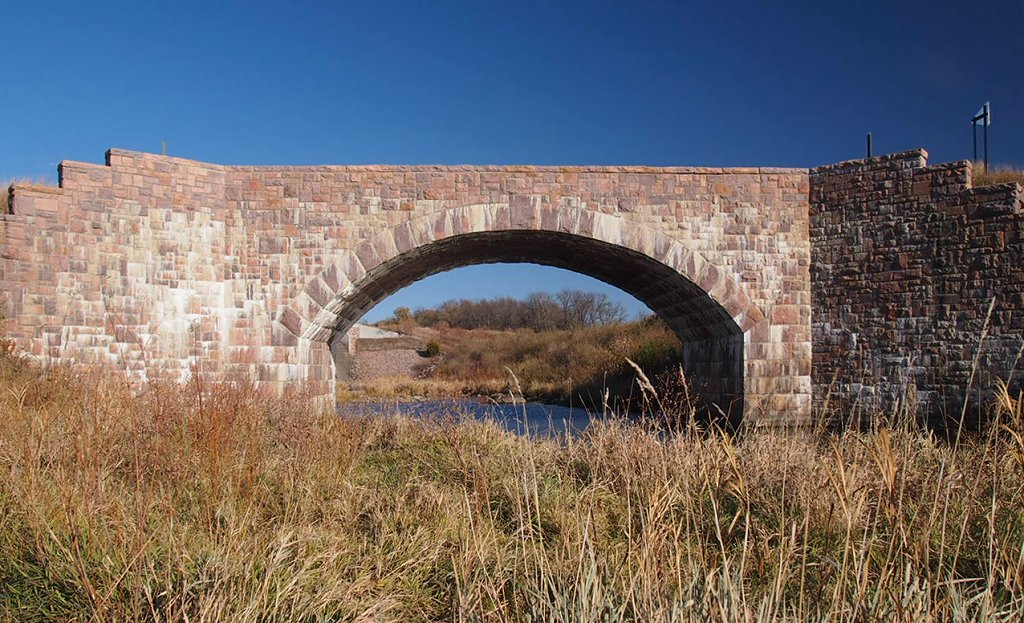
Minnesota Masonry-Arch Highway Bridge

== Split Rock Creek ==
Split Rock Creek
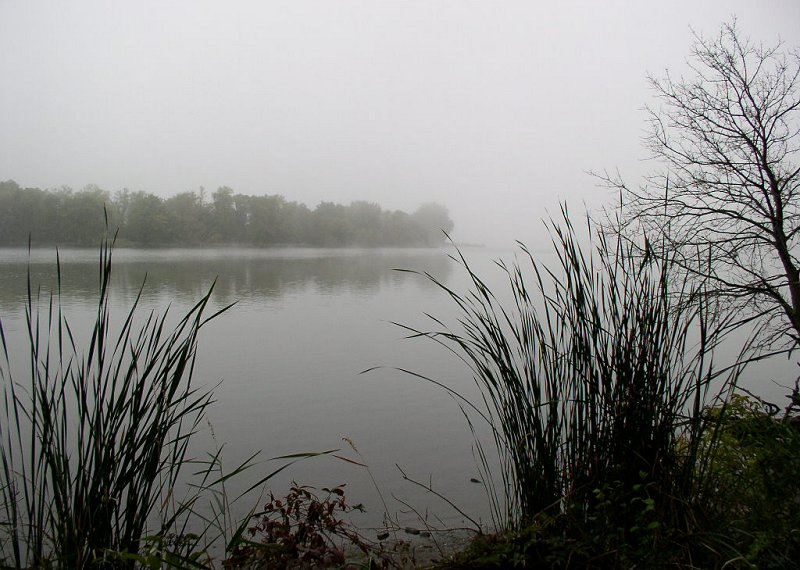
- Split Rock Creek in Split Rock Creek State Park, Minnesota

Location
- Country: United States
- State: South Dakota, Minnesota
- Counties: Minnehaha County, South Dakota, Pipestone County, Minnesota, Rock County, Minnesota

Physical characteristics
- Source
  - location: Ihlen, Minnesota
  - coordinates: 43.9908036°N 96.3061447°W
- Mouth
  - location: Pipestone, South Dakota
  - coordinates: 43.5496968°N 96.5975458°W
- Length: 55 mi (89 km)

Basin features
- River system: Missouri River
- Tributaries
  - left: Pipestone Creek

Split Rock Creek is a stream that flows for 55 miles from a farmers field near Ihlen, Rock County, Minnesota, to east of Sioux Falls, Minnehaha County, South Dakota. The native American name for the creek was Eminija. The creek enters South Dakota east of Sherman, South Dakota. West of Sherman it flows over a cement pad on 486th Avenue. It flows around Garretson and through Devil's Gulch. The creek then flows through Palisades State Park and then through McHardy Park in Brandon. East of Sioux Falls Pt finally flows into the Big Sioux River, which flows into the Missouri River, which flows into the Mississippi River.

== See also ==
- List of rivers of Minnesota
- List of rivers of South Dakota
