= Ihlen, Minnesota =

City in Minnesota, United States

Ihlen
- City
- Location of Ihlen, Minnesota
- Coordinates: 43°54′33″N 96°22′15″W
- Country: United States
- State: Minnesota
- County: Pipestone

Government
  - Type: Mayor - Council
  - Mayor: Austin bainbridge

Area
  - Total: 0.38 sq mi (0.98 km^{2})
  - Land: 0.37 sq mi (0.97 km^{2})
  - Water: 0.0039 sq mi (0.01 km^{2})
- Elevation: 1,634 ft (498 m)

Population (2020)
  - Total: 61
  - Density: 163.4/sq mi (63.08/km^{2})
- Time zone: UTC-6 (CST)
  - Summer (DST): UTC-5 (CDT)
- ZIP code: 56140
- Area code: 507
- FIPS code: 27-30806
- GNIS feature ID: 2394464

Ihlen (/ˈiːlən/ aɪ-lən) is a city in Pipestone County, Minnesota, United States. The population was 61 at the 2020 census.

== History ==
Ihlen was platted in 1888, and named for Carl Ihlen, the original owner of the town site. A post office was established at Ihlen in 1889.

== Geography ==
According to the United States Census Bureau, the city has a total area of 0.37 square miles (0.96 km^{2}), of which 0.36 square miles (0.93 km^{2}) is land and 0.01 square miles (0.03 km^{2}) is water. Split Rock Creek State Park is located in Ihlen.

Minnesota State Highway 23 serves as a main route in the community.

== Demographics ==
Historical population
Census	Pop.	Note	%±
1920	211		—
1930	203		−3.8%
1940	174		−14.3%
1950	135		−22.4%
1960	111		−17.8%
1970	132		18.9%
1980	129		−2.3%
1990	101		−21.7%
2000	107		5.9%
2010	63		−41.1%
2020	61		−3.2%
U.S. Decennial Census; 2020 Census

=== 2010 census ===
As of the census of 2010, there were 63 people, 32 households, and 20 families residing in the city. The population density was 175.0 inhabitants per square mile (67.6/km^{2}). There were 39 housing units at an average density of 108.3 per square mile (41.8/km^{2}). The racial makeup of the city was 95.2% White and 4.8% from other races. Hispanic or Latino of any race were 4.8% of the population.

There were 32 households, of which 15.6% had children under the age of 18 living with them, 56.3% were married couples living together, 3.1% had a female householder with no husband present, 3.1% had a male householder with no wife present, and 37.5% were non-families. 34.4% of all households were made up of individuals, and 21.9% had someone living alone who was 65 years of age or older. The average household size was 1.97 and the average family size was 2.50.

The median age in the city was 54.8 years. 11.1% of residents were under the age of 18; 4.8% were between the ages of 18 and 24; 8% were from 25 to 44; 41.2% were from 45 to 64; and 34.9% were 65 years of age or older. The gender makeup of the city was 46.0% male and 54.0% female.

=== 2000 census ===
As of the census of 2000, there were 107 people, 43 households, and 27 families residing in the city. The population density was 276.1 inhabitants per square mile (106.6/km^{2}). There were 44 housing units at an average density of 113.6 per square mile (43.9/km^{2}). The racial makeup of the city was 99.07% White and 0.93% Asian.

There were 43 households, out of which 23.3% had children under the age of 18 living with them, 58.1% were married couples living together, 7.0% had a female householder with no husband present, and 34.9% were non-families. 32.6% of all households were made up of individuals, and 16.3% had someone living alone who was 65 years of age or older. The average household size was 2.49 and the average family size was 3.18.

In the city, the population was spread out, with 25.2% under the age of 18, 5.6% from 18 to 24, 25.2% from 25 to 44, 22.4% from 45 to 64, and 21.5% who were 65 years of age or older. The median age was 42 years. For every 100 females, there were 94.5 males. For every 100 females age 18 and over, there were 90.5 males.

The median income for a household in the city was $31,250, and the median income for a family was $40,000. Males had a median income of $22,000 versus $18,958 for females. The per capita income for the city was $14,569. There were no families and 0.9% of the population living below the poverty line, including no under eighteens and none of those over 64.

== Politics ==
Ihlen is located in Minnesota's 7th congressional district, represented by Collin Peterson, a Democrat. At the state level, Ihlen is located in Senate District 22, represented by Republican Bill Weber, and in House District 22A, represented by Republican Joe Schomacker.
