= Mahoney Creek =

Stream in South Dakota, U.S.

Coordinates: 45°02′50″N 97°10′08″W

Mahoney Creek is a stream in the U.S. state of South Dakota.

Mahoney Creek has the name of a local family.

== See also ==
- List of rivers of South Dakota
