= Sioux Area Metro =

Local government transit agency in South Dakota

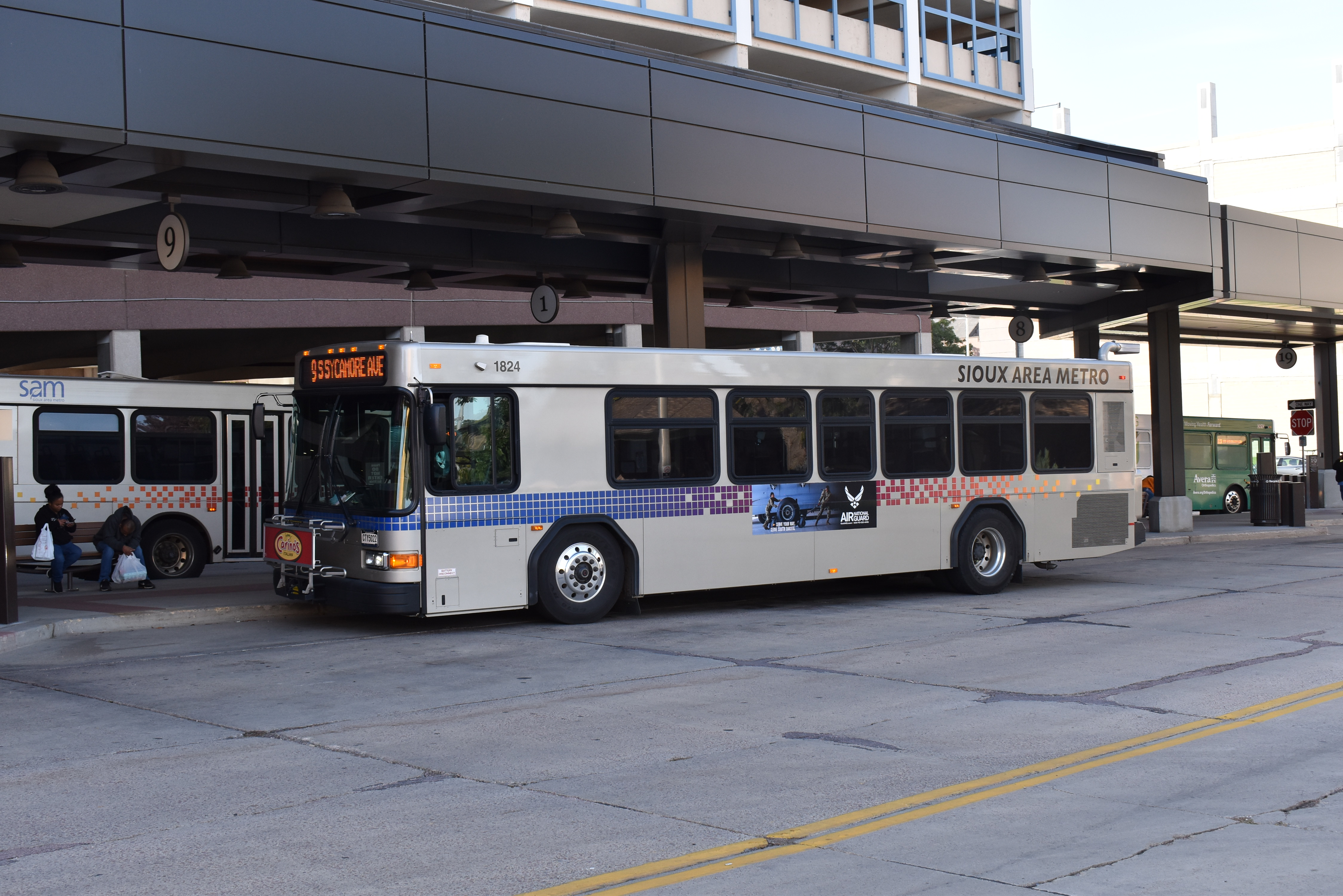
- A SAM bus at the downtown terminal
- Parent: City of Sioux Falls
- Headquarters: 500 E. Sixth St.
- Locale: Sioux Falls, South Dakota
- Service area: Urban area
- Service type: Bus service Tourist trolley Paratransit
- Routes: 12
- Fleet: 29
- Daily ridership: 1,800 (weekdays, Q4 2025)
- Annual ridership: 559,400 (2025)
- Operator: Via Transportation
- Website: Official Site

The Sioux Area Metro (SAM) is the local governmental transit agency in Sioux Falls, South Dakota, and the state's largest public transportation operator. They provide multiple scheduled fixed routes and paratransit services. In December 2023, city council members voted unanimously to select Via as its technology and operations partner. In 2025, the system had a ridership of 559,400, or about 1,800 per weekday as of the fourth quarter of 2025.

== Operations ==
Effective February 1, 2016

Routes operate Monday-Saturday unless otherwise indicated.

No.	Destinations	Notes
1	VA Hospital, South Kiwanis Ave	
2	Sanford Hospital, Augustana University, South Western Ave	
3	South Minnesota Ave, West 41st St, Empire Mall	
4	East 10th St	
5	Avera Hospital, South Cliff Ave, South Phillips Ave	
6	PREMIER Center, Terrace Park	
7	East Sioux Falls, Dawley Farms Village	
8	North 4th Ave, North Cliff Ave	Weekday Only
9	East 18th St, East 26th St	
10	West 12th St, Hayward Park, South Marion Rd	
11	Southwest Circulator	
19	University Center, Southeast Technical Institute, North Career Ave, Sioux Falls Bus Station	Weekday Only

=== Downtown bus terminal ===
The Sioux Area Metro Depot was originally built in 1988 and known as "The Bus Stop". In 2017, the facility underwent a $2 million renovation and reopened on November 6, 2017, with the name Sioux Area Metro Depot. The renovations included a skylight, new canopy, new benches, bike storage and bike repair station. The facility serves 11 routes.

=== Discontinued Services ===
Sioux Area Metro operated an old-time trolley styled bus in the downtown area. In 2014 operation of the service was assumed by Downtown Sioux Falls Inc, and in 2019 they were joined by a coalition of local businesses to continue funding through 2022.

Sioux Area Metro also operated four school "tripper" routes until May 2016. These routes were open to the public, with high schools as destinations. School Bus, Inc is currently operating those routes.

=== Fleet ===
SAM operates a fleet of 26 fixed-route buses and 13 paratransit buses which run on biodiesel.

== Paratransit ==
Sioux Area Metro provides paratransit services alongside its fixed-route bus and microtransit networks. The service operates within the same general service area on a scheduled and demand-responsive basis and uses accessible vehicles.

== Fixed route ridership ==
The ridership and service statistics shown here are of fixed route services only and do not include demand response.

Ridership Data from the NTD
Year	Ridership	Change
2013	1,023,089	▼0.35%
2014	955,357	▼6.62%
2015	885,104	▼7.35%
2016	837,474	▼5.38%
2017	795,026	▼5.07%
2018	782,129	▼1.62%
2019	769,437	▼1.62%
2020	445,205	▼42.14%
2021	389,816	▼12.44%
2022	385,565	▼1.09%
2023	502,993	▲30.46%

== See also ==
- Rapid City Rapid Ride
- YST Transit
- List of bus transit systems in the United States
