= Valley Springs, South Dakota =

- City
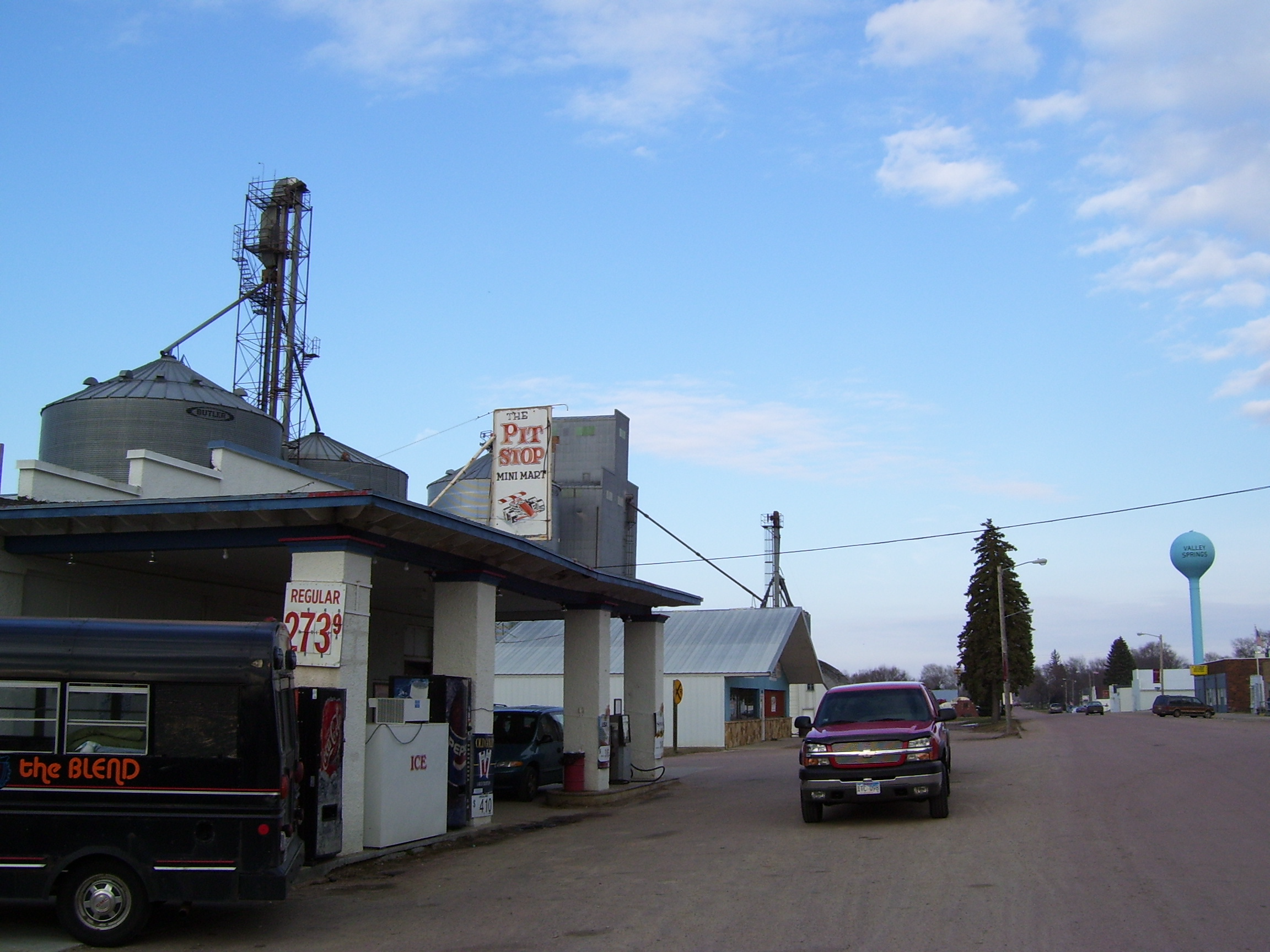
- View down Broadway Avenue in Valley Springs
- Motto: "The Front Door to South Dakota"
- Location in Minnehaha County and the state of South Dakota
- Coordinates: 43°34′57″N 96°27′56″W
- Country: United States
- State: South Dakota
- County: Minnehaha
- Founded: 1872
- Incorporated: 1879

Area
  - Total: 0.98 sq mi (2.55 km^{2})
  - Land: 0.98 sq mi (2.55 km^{2})
  - Water: 0 sq mi (0.00 km^{2})
- Elevation: 1,401 ft (427 m)

Population (2020)
  - Total: 885
  - Density: 898.8/sq mi (347.03/km^{2})
- Time zone: UTC-6 (Central (CST))
  - Summer (DST): UTC-5 (CDT)
- ZIP code: 57068
- Area code: 605
- FIPS code: 46-66260
- GNIS feature ID: 1267610
- Website: City of Valley Springs, South Dakota

Valley Springs is a city in southeastern Minnehaha County, South Dakota, United States. The population was 885 at the 2020 census.

== History ==
Valley Springs was founded on November 13, 1872, and incorporated on February 22, 1879. The city was named from nearby springs in the valley of Beaver Creek.

== Geography ==
Valley Springs lies near the South Dakota—Minnesota state line. According to the United States Census Bureau, the city has a total area of 0.82 square miles (2.12 km^{2}), all land.

== Demographics ==
Historical population
Census	Pop.	Note	%±
1880	96		—
1890	308		220.8%
1900	388		26.0%
1910	331		−14.7%
1920	374		13.0%
1930	393		5.1%
1940	396		0.8%
1950	389		−1.8%
1960	472		21.3%
1970	566		19.9%
1980	801		41.5%
1990	739		−7.7%
2000	792		7.2%
2010	759		−4.2%
2020	885		16.6%
U.S. Decennial Census

=== 2020 census ===
As of the 2020 census, Valley Springs had a population of 885, and the median age was 34.0 years. 29.9% of residents were under the age of 18 and 10.4% were 65 years of age or older. For every 100 females there were 116.4 males, and for every 100 females age 18 and over there were 115.3 males.

0.0% of residents lived in urban areas, while 100.0% lived in rural areas.

There were 340 households in Valley Springs, of which 38.2% had children under the age of 18 living in them. Of all households, 49.7% were married-couple households, 25.3% were households with a male householder and no spouse or partner present, and 17.9% were households with a female householder and no spouse or partner present. About 24.4% of all households were made up of individuals and 6.7% had someone living alone who was 65 years of age or older.

There were 361 housing units, of which 5.8% were vacant. The homeowner vacancy rate was 1.1% and the rental vacancy rate was 6.1%.

Racial composition as of the 2020 census
Race	Number	Percent
White	813	91.9%
Black or African American	4	0.5%
American Indian and Alaska Native	9	1.0%
Asian	3	0.3%
Native Hawaiian and Other Pacific Islander	2	0.2%
Some other race	8	0.9%
Two or more races	46	5.2%
Hispanic or Latino (of any race)	12	1.4%

=== 2010 census ===
As of the census of 2010, there were 759 people, 306 households, and 202 families residing in the city. The population density was 925.6 inhabitants per square mile (357.4/km^{2}). There were 327 housing units at an average density of 398.8 units per square mile (154.0 units/km^{2}). The racial makeup of the city was 95.9% White, 0.5% African American, 0.7% Native American, 0.1% Asian, 0.8% from other races, and 2.0% from two or more races. Hispanic or Latino of any race were 1.2% of the population.

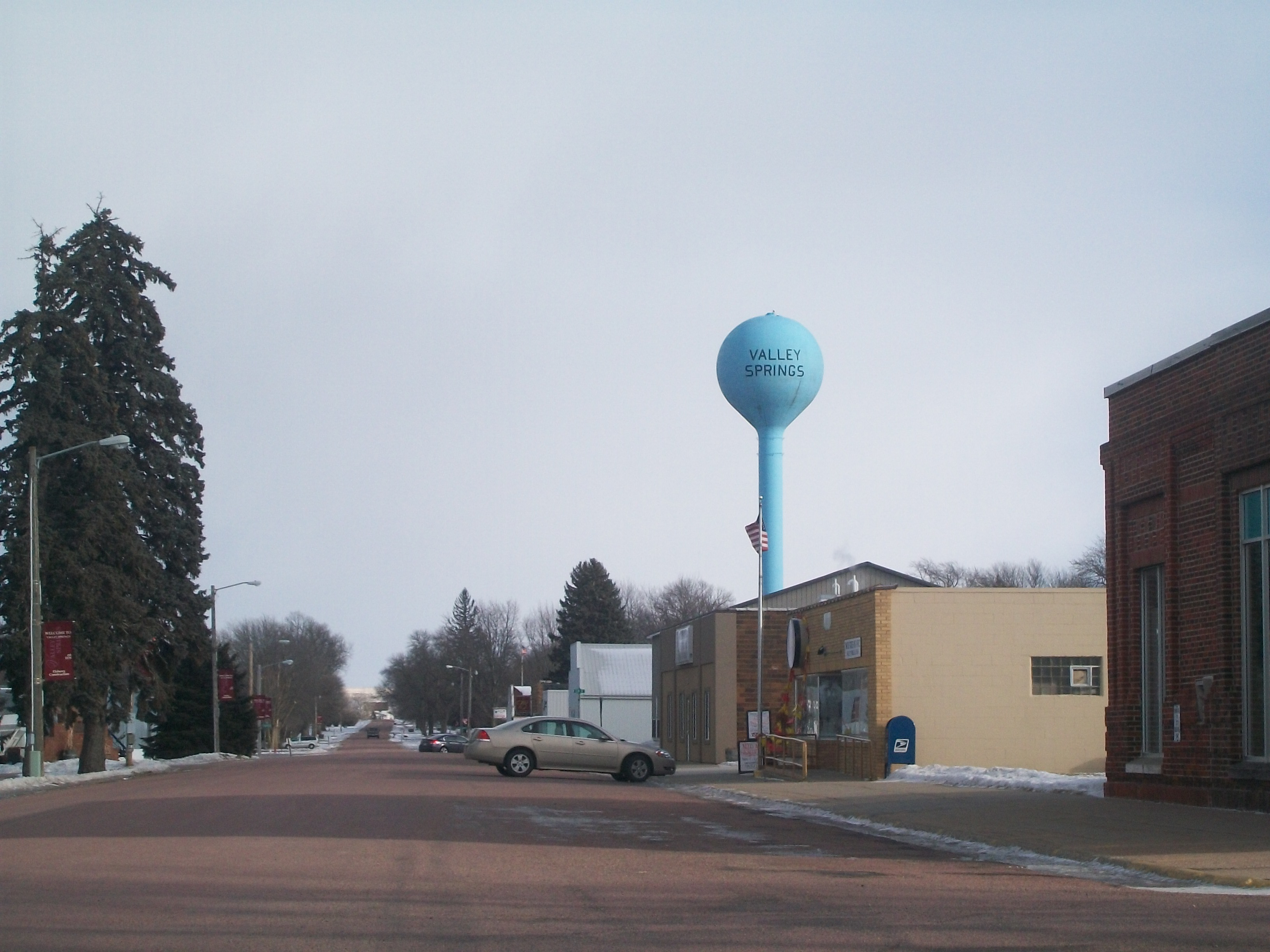
Along Broadway Avenue

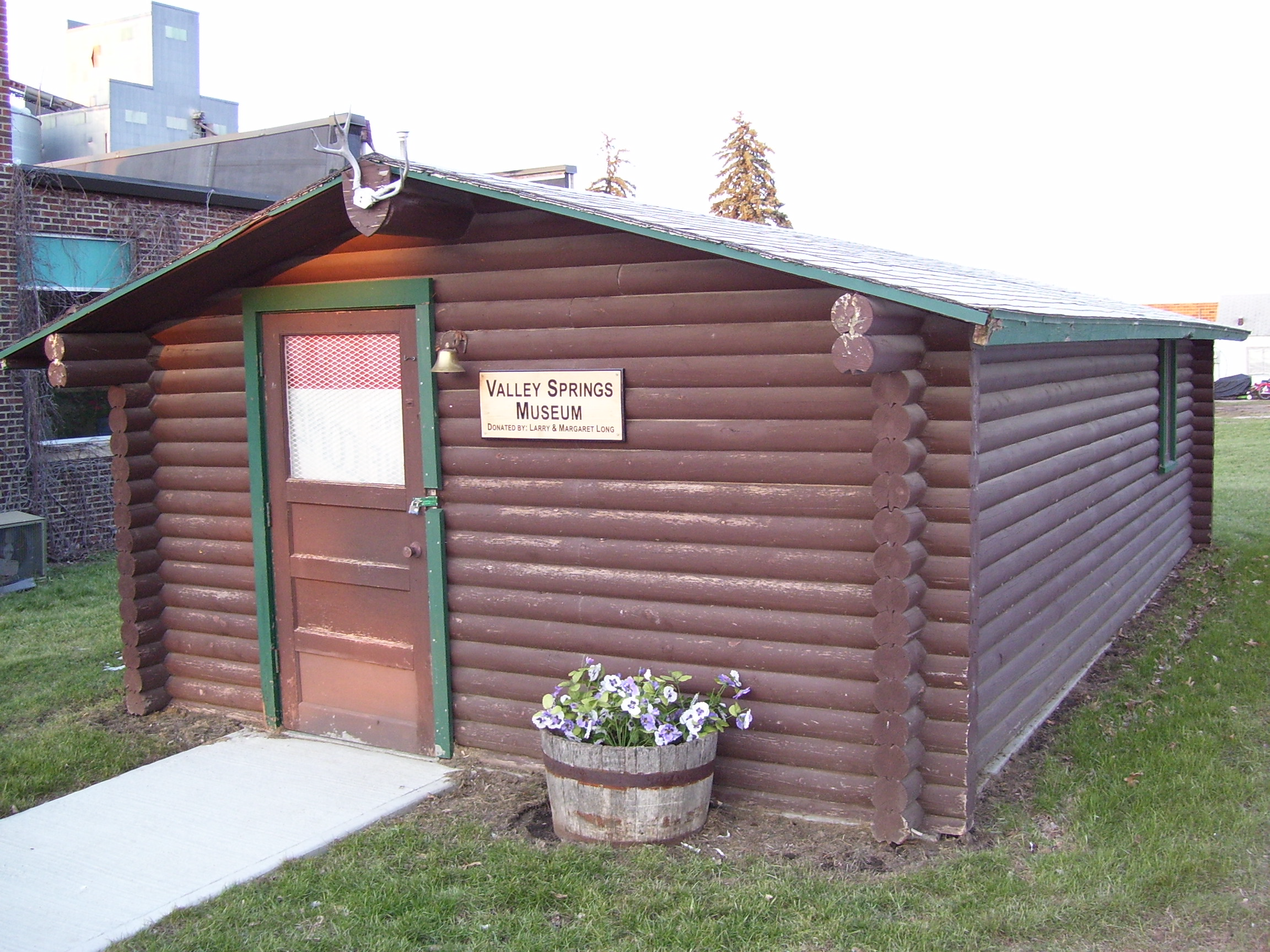
The Valley Springs town museum

There were 306 households, of which 36.9% had children under the age of 18 living with them, 50.7% were married couples living together, 9.5% had a female householder with no husband present, 5.9% had a male householder with no wife present, and 34.0% were non-families. 28.4% of all households were made up of individuals, and 8.5% had someone living alone who was 65 years of age or older. The average household size was 2.48 and the average family size was 3.00.

The median age in the city was 36.4 years. 28.2% of residents were under the age of 18; 6% were between the ages of 18 and 24; 29.7% were from 25 to 44; 28% were from 45 to 64; and 8% were 65 years of age or older. The gender makeup of the city was 52.6% male and 47.4% female.

=== 2000 census ===
As of the census of 2000, there were 792 people, 292 households, and 212 families residing in the city. The population density was 975.8 inhabitants per square mile (376.8/km^{2}). There were 299 housing units at an average density of 368.4 units per square mile (142.2 units/km^{2}). The racial makeup of the city was 98.48% White, 0.25% Native American, 0.38% Asian, 0.63% from other races, and 0.25% from two or more races. Hispanic or Latino of any race were 1.01% of the population.

There were 292 households, out of which 38.4% had children under the age of 18 living with them, 58.9% were married couples living together, 9.6% had a female householder with no husband present, and 27.1% were non-families. 21.6% of all households were made up of individuals, and 9.9% had someone living alone who was 65 years of age or older. The average household size was 2.71 and the average family size was 3.17.

In the city, the population was spread out, with 29.8% under the age of 18, 9.3% from 18 to 24, 32.4% from 25 to 44, 19.7% from 45 to 64, and 8.7% who were 65 years of age or older. The median age was 32 years. For every 100 females, there were 95.1 males. For every 100 females age 18 and over, there were 101.4 males.

The median income for a household in the city was $45,089, and the median income for a family was $49,167. Males had a median income of $28,839 versus $21,000 for females. The per capita income for the city was $16,507. About 4.3% of families and 7.0% of the population were below the poverty line, including 9.2% of those under age 18 and 4.2% of those age 65 or over.

== Education ==
Valley Springs Public Schools have been a part of the Brandon Valley School District since the Brandon School District and Valley Springs District consolidated with 12 other rural/common school districts in 1962. The city is home to the Valley Springs Elementary School. The school ceased operation following the 2023-2024 school year due to declining enrollment numbers. As of November 2025, there are no current plans for the building.
