= SDSD =

SDSD may refer to:

- South Dakota School for the Deaf
- South Delta School District
