= Charles City College Hall =

- U.S. National Register of Historic Places
- U.S. Historic district – Contributing property
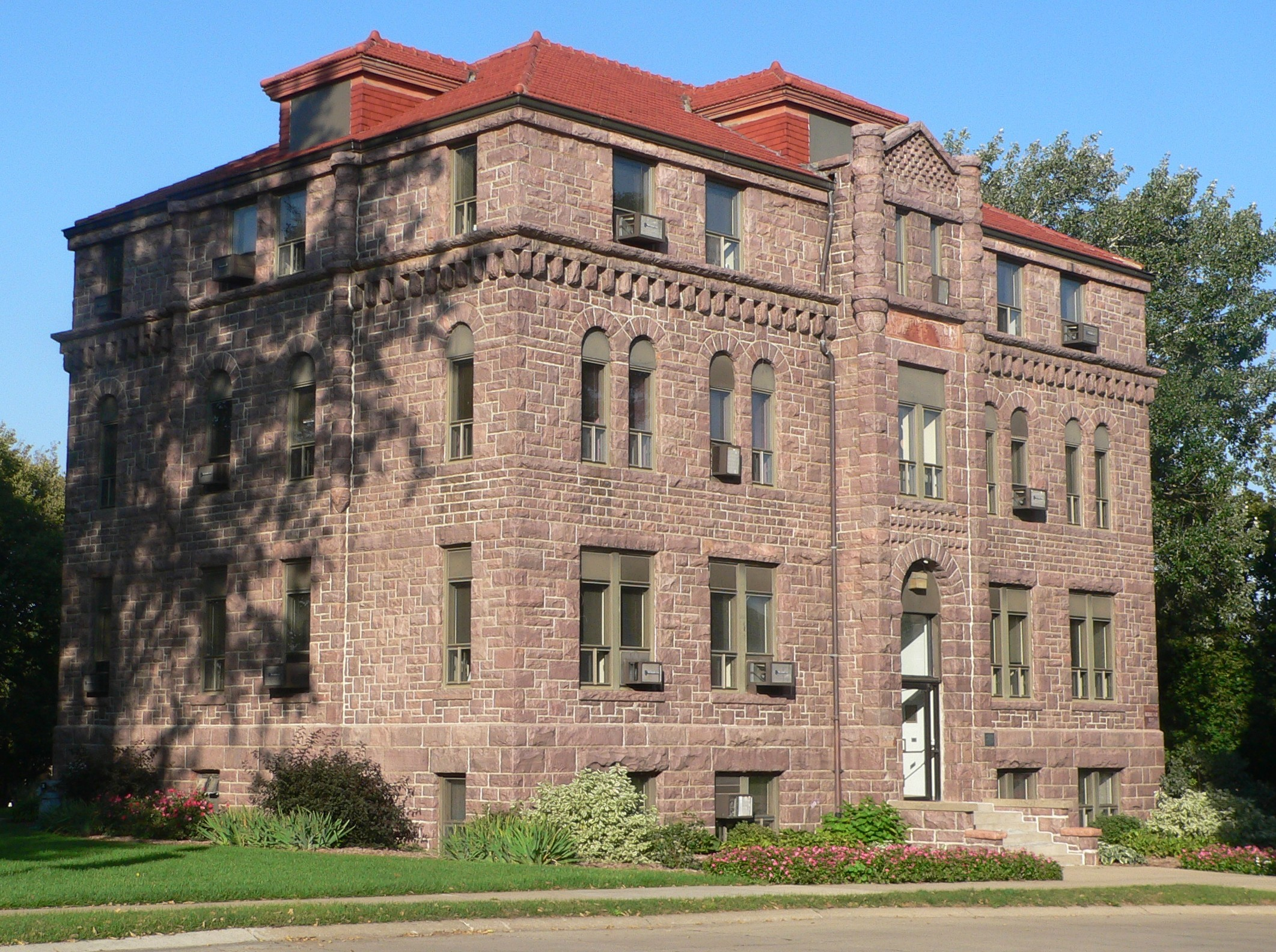

- Location within Iowa Location within the United States
- Location: 1501 Morningside Ave. Sioux City, Iowa
- Coordinates: 42°28′30.8″N 96°21′36.4″W
- Area: 2 acres (0.81 ha)
- Built: 1890, 1915
- Built by: John M. Poorbaugh (1890); Coomer & Small
- Architect: Charles P. Brown (1890); Beuttler & Arnold (1915)
- Architectural style: Romanesque Revival
- Part of: Morningside College Historic District (ID97000387)
- NRHP reference No.: 83000412
- Added to NRHP: January 21, 1983

Charles City College Hall, also known as Old Main, North Hall and Conservatory Hall, is a historic building located on the campus of Morningside College in Sioux City, Iowa, United States. Business leaders in the community established the University of the Northwest in 1889 to provide educational, cultural and economic growth in the city. Completed in 1890, this is the first building constructed for the college and it housed all of the school's functions. The exterior of the Richardsonian Romanesque structure is composed of quartzite. Local architect Charles P. Brown designed the building and John M. Poorbaugh was the contractor. By 1894 the university became a victim of the Panic of 1893, and the property was taken over by the Methodist Episcopal Church who incorporated Morningside College the same year.

Another building was built on campus in 1890 and this building became the music conservatory, which enhanced the cultural life of the community through its educational offerings and the concerts that were held here. The building was gutted in a fire in 1914, and it was rebuilt but without its original cross-gable roof and tower. The windowless roof dormers were added at that time as well. The architectural firm of Beuttler & Arnold planned the rebuilding and Coomer & Small was the contractor. It received its current name after Morningside College merged with Charles City College of the German Methodist Episcopal Church. It was individually listed on the National Register of Historic Places in 1983, and as a contributing property in the Morningside College Historic District in 1997.
