= Downtown Vermillion Historic District =

Historic district in South Dakota, United States

- U.S. National Register of Historic Places
- U.S. Historic district
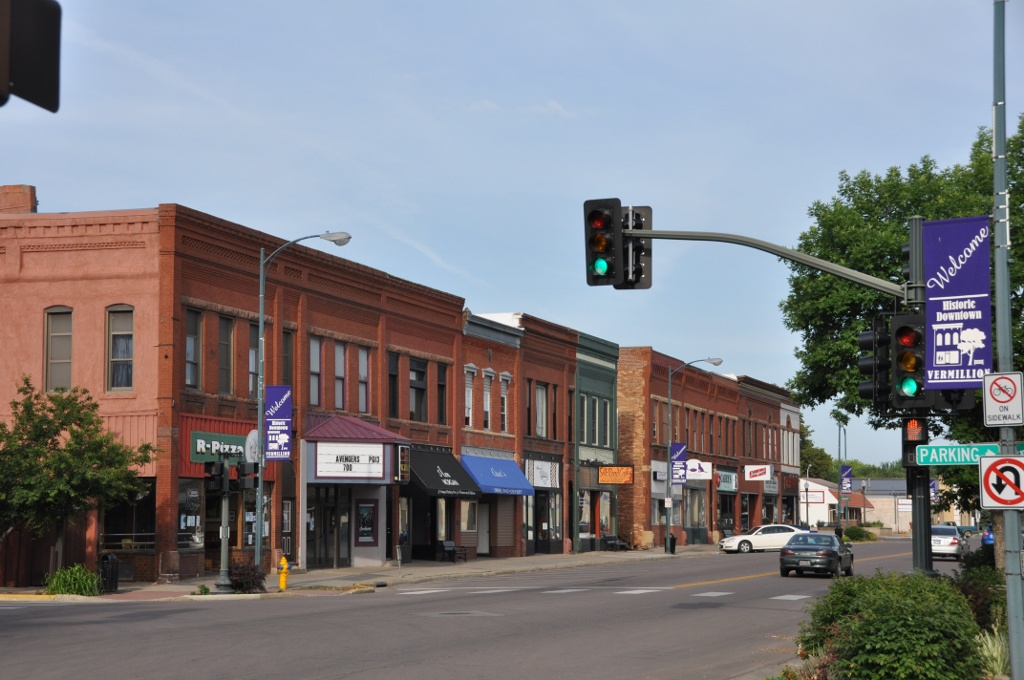
- Downtown Vermillion in 2012

- Location within South Dakota Location within the United States
- Interactive map of Downtown Vermillion Historic District
- Location: Main Street, roughly bounded by Market and Dakota Streets; Vermillion, South Dakota
- Coordinates: 42°46′45″N 96°55′52″W
- Area: 21 acres (8.5 ha)
- Built: 1880
- Architect: Arnold and Bueittler; Dow, Wallace, et al.
- Architectural style: Classical Revival, Early Commercial
- NRHP reference No.: 02001288
- Added to NRHP: March 7, 2003

Downtown Vermillion Historic District is a historic district in downtown Vermillion, South Dakota, consisting of 34 contributing buildings all constructed between 1880 and 1942. The district was added to the National Register of Historic Places in 2003 and reflects a period of substantial economic growth in Vermillion, as well as for its representation of late 19th and early 20th century architectural styles.

== History ==
When Vermillion was founded in 1859, it was originally located on the banks of the Missouri River, south of the town's present-day site. However, after the Great Flood of 1881 destroyed most of the town, the citizens rebuilt atop the bluff to the north, where some buildings had already been established in the decades prior to the flooding; three buildings along West Main Street formed the foundations of the new commercial developments. Businesses along Market and Main Streets competed with one another to be considered the primary commercial road in Vermillion; however, due to city planning issues on Market Street, Main Street eventually won out as the central hub. Following fires in 1890 and 1893, wooden structures on Main and Market Streets had been banned by the city council; as a result, buildings were constructed out of sturdier materials and have survived to the present day.

Development was hindered by the Panic of 1893, but by 1897, local business was slowly recovering and new buildings were being constructed by 1899. This resulted in a boom of new growth; many downtown buildings are from this first decade of the 20th century. Today, these buildings mainly host stores and restaurants, as well as movie theaters, meeting halls, and a library.

== Architecture ==
The Downtown Vermillion Historic District reflects a blend of architectural styles. Earlier buildings typically reflect Classical Revival, and those built after the beginning of the 20th century often used Early Commercial style. They were constructed primarily out of red or orange bricks made from clay harvested from the Missouri River Valley. Between 1881 and 1907, Bower's Brick Yard in Vermillion provided most of the bricks used in the earlier structures. Sioux Quartzite quarried nearby was also used extensively, typically left unpolished to create a rough outer façade. Regionally-notable architects Wallace L. Dow and Joseph Schwartz contributed to the building of two district properties previously listed with the NRHP.

== Contributing properties ==
All 34 contributing buildings to the district were constructed between 1880 and 1942, marking a period of commercial development in the city. Thirty-three buildings were included in the original nomination, and 100 East Main Street was added later, after renovations restored it to its historical appearance.

- 1 West Main Street: Constructed in 1900 out of Sioux Quartzite and brick, this two-story commercial building sits at the northwest corner of Main and Center Streets. Its southern façade features rough quartzite decorations and columns. Its second story features arched windows; on the southern elevation, these windows have rough quartzite lintels and sills, with small columns between each one. Those on the eastern face lack the lintels and columns.
- 2, 4, and 6 West Main Street: This building was constructed with three storefronts and was completed in 1885. Between each shop entry is a shared entryway leading to the second floor. The corner of each bay is decorated with brick a pilaster. The second-story windows are decorated with quartzite sills and lintels. The building is topped by a brickwork parapet.
- 3 West Main Street: This two-story brick building, constructed in 1900, has a striking bicolor red-and-white front façade. Its original central entry has been replaced with a large display windows, and the door has been repositioned to the southeast corner. Its three second-floor double-hung windows have white stone sills and white metal hoods. The intricate bracketed cornice at the roof is crafted out of pressed sheet metal. A rear addition was built in 1920.
- 9 West Main Street: A simple one-story brick building constructed in 1900, it has a central entry for a shop. Its front display windows were replaced in the 1960s. It has a flat roof, the parapet of which is made of limestone.
- 10 West Main Street: Constructed in 1914, this is a two-story Commercial-style brick building featuring decorative brickwork and large plate glass windows, which were replaced in the 1950s.
- 12 West Main Street: Bordered on its west face by an alley, this two-story brick building was constructed in 1901. Its entrance is bordered by an arched brickwork lintels.
- 13 West Main Street: This block of buildings anchored the development of Main Street after the Great Flood of 1881, as they already existed at the time. Constructed in 1880 with an addition in 1900, this building is two stories and features a recessed central entryway bordered by large display windows. Two oriel windows with metal cornices sit on the second story of its southern façade.
- 14, 16, and 18 West Main Street: This 1915 building contains three storefronts. It was crafted in the Commercial style and although it is made primarily of brick, it has some quartzite decorations. Its front ground floor display windows are made out of historic plate glass, and are some of the only original such windows in the historic district. There is a central door between 16 and 18 West Main, which provides access to the second floor.
- 15 West Main Street: Constructed in 1880, this is a very simple one-story red brick building with a central entrance and windows on either side.
- 17 and 19 West Main Street: Very similar in construction to 15 West Main Street and constructed at the same time, although it provides entrances for two shops and was constructed out of orange brick.
- 20 and 22 West Main Street: Constructed around 1914 as an addition to 24 West Main, this building provides two storefronts. It represents the Commercial style and is two stories, crafted of brick which decorative quartzite and brickwork. The parapet features a pressed metal cornice in a leaf pattern.
- 23 and 25 West Main Street: Although both properties were constructed at separate times (1910 and 1906, respectively) and are treated as independent properties by the NRHP, they are listed together here due to their second floors being contiguous and giving the illusion of a single construction. However, the first-floor façades of each property are made out of different brick, and 25 West Main features a marble kick plate that wraps around the corner of the building. 25 West Main sits at the northeast corner of Main and Prospect Streets, with 23 West Main sharing a wall to its east. Each shop has its own entrance on its front south-facing façade. A central door between them leads to a shared staircase, which provides access to the second floors. A green hipped-roof awning was constructed above the front entrances in 2000. Seven double-hung windows sit on the second floor, adorned with rough-hewn limestone sills and parapets, and divided into separate bays by detailed pilasters that extend to the flat roof. An intricately detailed parapet sits atop the building. 25 West Main's western elevation (running along Prospect Street) features multiple shop windows, all with the same rough limestone sills, and another shop entrance.
- 24 West Main Street: Constructed in 1910 with a rear addition in 1942, this red brick Commercial building features decorative quartzite bands around its front façade and windows.

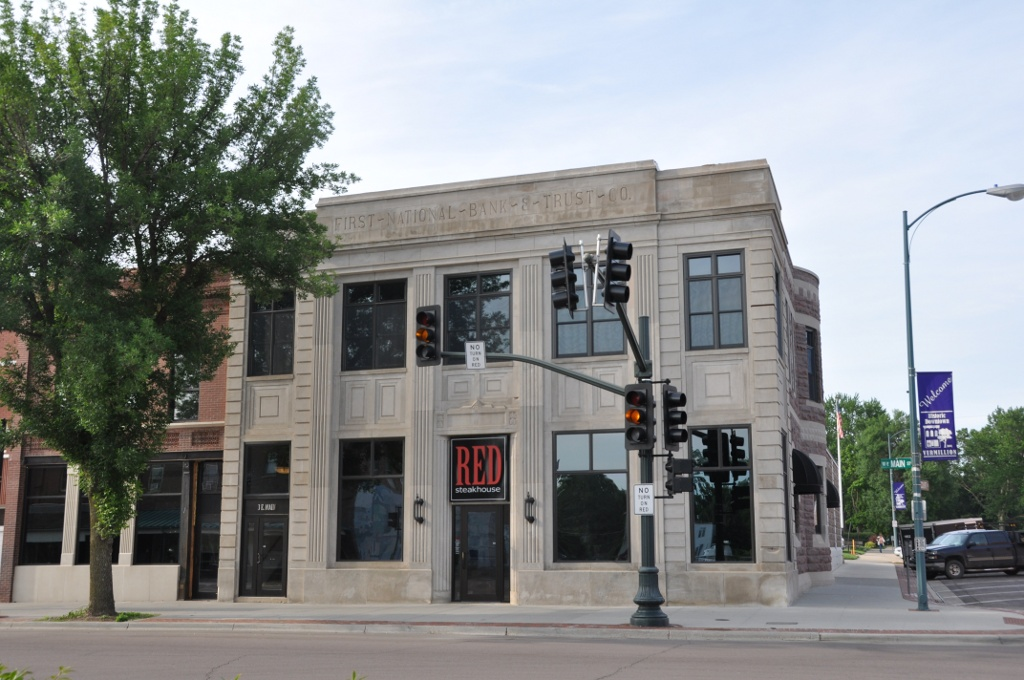
First National Bank Building of Vermillion

- First National Bank Building of Vermillion, 1 East Main Street: This property was separately listed in 1986 but is contained within the boundaries of this historic district. It was first constructed in 1893, with major renovations taking place in 1929.
- 2 East Main Street: Built in 1920 and situated at the northeast corner of Main and Center Streets, this large two-story brick building has been largely altered from its original appearance. A large stucco mural adorns its western face, from which all first-story windows have been removed. Large arched windows with metal linels and sills and a wide metal cornice span the open sides of the building.
- 5 East Main Street: Like its neighbor, 5 East Main, it was constructed in 1900 out of red brick.
- 6 East Main Street: Like many buildings in the district, this building's front façade was remodeled in the 1960s. Originally constructed around 1910 out of red brick, its original central entrance has been moved to the southeast corner and replaced with a large plate display window. Its second story features three arched windows with decorative recessed brick lintels. Its ornate parapet is decorated with a brick bracketed cornice.
- 7 East Main Street: Constructed in 1900, this is a two-story red brick building. Its windows and parapet have white decorative stone accents.
- Oddfellow Hall; 14, 16, and 18 East Main Street: Constructed in 1900, this two-story flat-roofed brick building was once the headquarters of the town's Odd Fellows chapter dating back to 1911. A stone sign is still visible on the front of the building declaring its origins. The first story of its front has been significantly altered. The original building had three storefronts, but today there are only two. The entryways are recessed and bordered by large plate glass display windows. The large arched windows on the second story have been filled with wood paneling and smaller, square windows.
- Muenster Building, 100 East Main Street: This one-story Early Commercial-style building was added to the historic district at a later date, after the false façade added in the 1950s had been removed and exposed the original entrance.

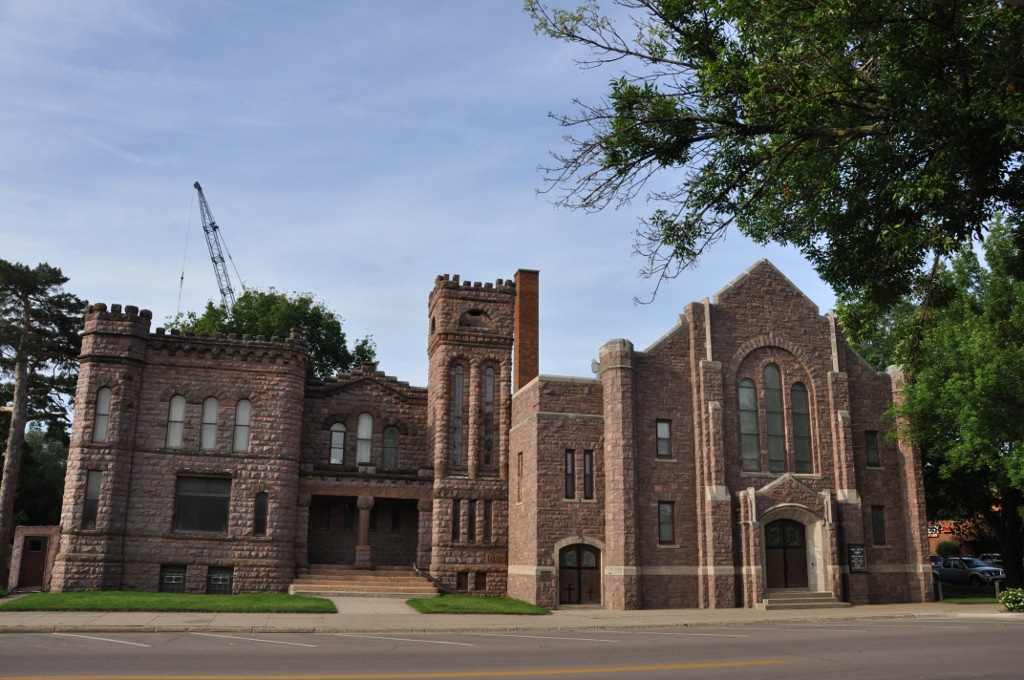
First Baptist Church of Vermillion

- First Baptist Church of Vermillion, 101 East Main Street: Independently listed in 1982.
- 102 East Main Street: Constructed out of red brick in 1906 in the Early Commercial style, 102 East Main is a one-story shop at the northeast corner of Main and Elm Streets. Its brickwork and style are identical to the other contributing buildings on the north side of this block: 104-108 Main Street. Its entrance was largely remodeled in the 1960s and now features large display windows and its main door at the southeast corner.
- 104 East Main Street: This two-story building was constructed in 1929.
- 106 and 108 East Main Street: This building contains two storefronts and was constructed in 1906. Its central entryway was removed in the 1960s and replaced with two separate entryways with large plate glass windows.
- 113 and 115 East Main Street: This is a one-story Commercial-style brick building featuring two storefronts.
- 117 East Main Street: Constructed in 1910, this is a one-story Commercial-style brick building with one storefront. It is very simple in design.
- 119 and 121 East Main Street: One of the newer contributing buildings in the historic district, this property was built in 1930 out of brown brick and contains two storefronts. It is a very simple one-story building with little decoration, except for some decorative brickwork on the parapet and window lintels.
- 15 Court Street: Situated on the corner of Court and Kidder Streets, this red brick building was initially built in 1890 for a lumber company, as evidenced by two loading bay doors and its large factory windows. Although most windows have arched openings, all have been infilled with rectangular glass blocks. Pilasters adorn the corners of the building and provide each face into bays.
- 7 Center Street: This small, one-story building has a front façade made out of orange brick and decorative red quoins and was constructed in 1922.
- 12 Center Street: This two-story building, constructed in 1900 out of orange brick, features a decorated parapet atop its flat roof.
- Waldorf Livery, 26 and 28 Center Street: Located across from City Hall, this wide, two-story building was created in 1902 as the livery stables for the City of Vermillion. Its shallow gambrel roof sets it apart from other buildings in the district, most of which have flat or gable roofs. Today, it has three doors in its front façade. The second floor of this face contains two circular windows on each end, two double-hung windows, and in the center a band of three double-hung windows. On the building's north face are the remains of eight arched windows, many of which are now boarded up.

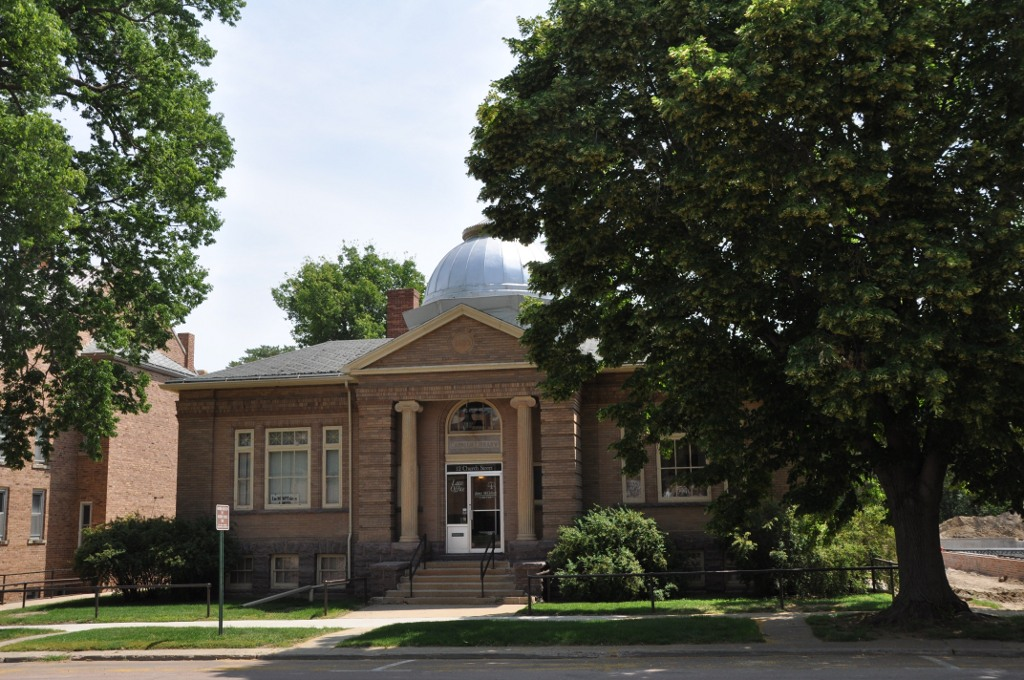
Carnegie Library

- Carnegie Library, 12 Church Street: Independently listed in 1983.
