= Old Main (University of South Dakota) =

- U.S. National Register of Historic Places
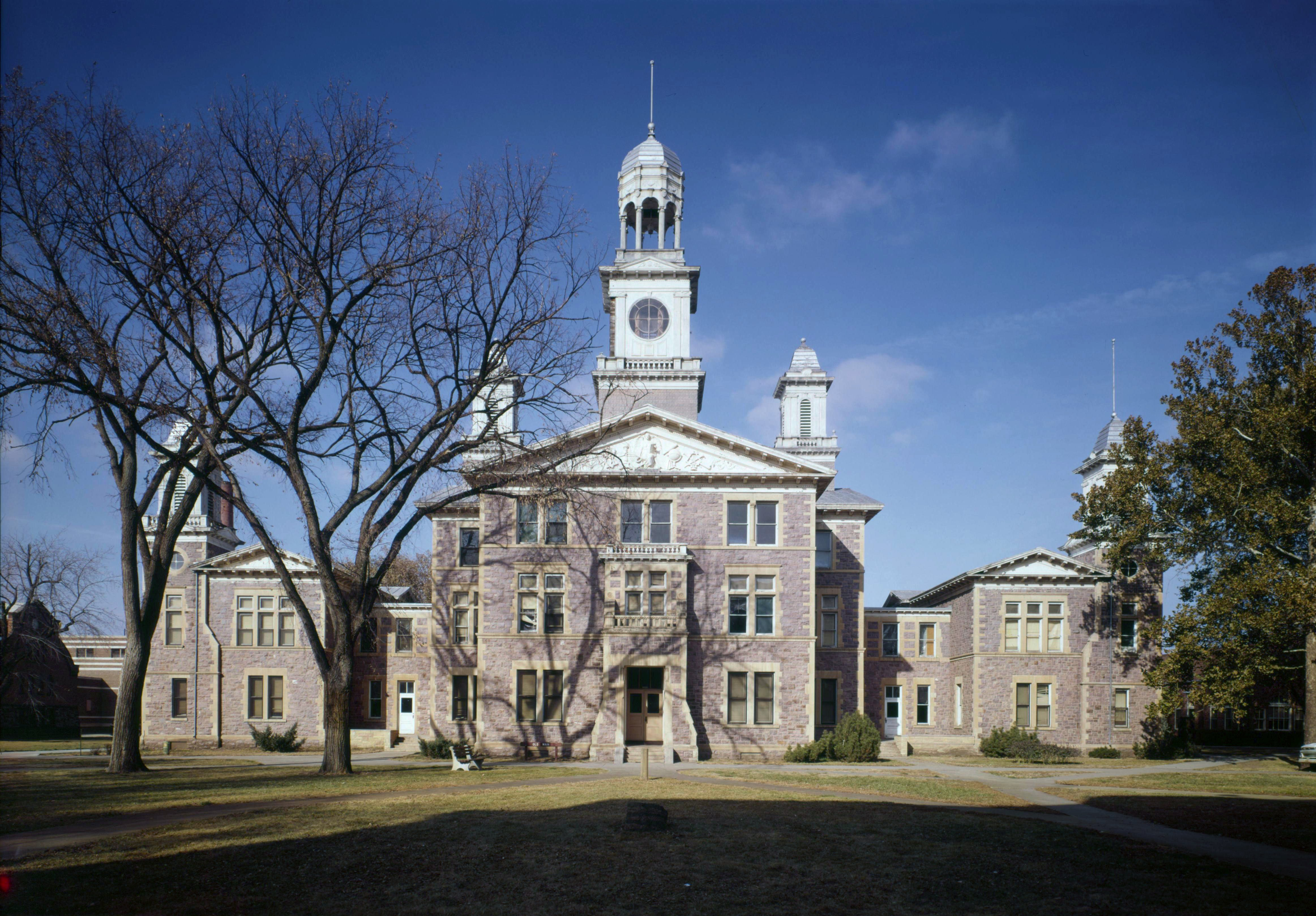
- Old Main viewed from the front

- Location within South Dakota
- Location: Clark Street, Vermillion, South Dakota
- Coordinates: 42°47′02″N 96°55′26″W
- Built: 1883
- Architect: Wallace L. Dow
- Architectural style: Colonial Revival
- NRHP reference No.: 73001738
- Added to NRHP: March 24, 1973

Old Main, originally known as University Hall and Main Hall, is a historic university building at the University of South Dakota. Originally built in 1883, it is the oldest building on campus, despite having been rebuilt after an 1893 fire. It has been listed on the National Register of Historic Places since 1973.

== Architecture and functions ==
The original University Hall was constructed by Sioux Falls architect Wallace L. Dow in a mixed architectural style, but with undoubtable Scandinavian influence. The new 1893 building has a marked Colonial Revival influence. It consists of a central three-story building, the main door facing south, with two-story wings on its east and west sides. It was constructed from pink quartzite taken from a quarry near Sioux Falls and sandstone trim along the windows, doors, and corners of the building. Friezes, box cornices, and brackets adorn the exterior of the building, mainly made out of stamped sheet metal. The building has four cupolas: two on the central building and one on each wing. An apse on the northern end of the central building houses Farber Hall, a small theatre that doubles as a lecture hall. The most noticeable feature of the building is the large spire atop the central building.

Besides still hosting classes, Old Main is home to Farber Hall, named for Dr. William O. Farber, where lectures and other events are held. The University Honors Program offices and the Oscar Howe Gallery are located on the ground floor.

== History ==
When the University of South Dakota (then simply the University of Dakota) began holding classes in 1883, it was operating out of rented space in a building in downtown Vermillion. University Hall was the first building in the former Dakota Territory to be specifically built for an institution of higher public education. Using $10,000 in bonds proceeds raised by Clay County, the west wing of University Hall was completed in 1883, and the university moved in. The central tower of the building was constructed between 1884 and 1885, and the final east wing was completed in 1887.

In 1893, University Hall caught fire. The interior was gutted but the exterior remained standing, and the hall began being rebuilt immediately. Over $42,500 was raised by the county and citizens of Vermillion for the repairs. Some materials used in the reconstruction included retired building materials from the 1893 World's Fair in Chicago. Among these repurposed materials were the metal friezes on the exterior front of the building, which can still be viewed today. These renovations were completed in August 1899.

Several other buildings have been constructed in the decades since the university was founded, but Old Main still sits at the center of campus. Major renovations were completed between 1993 and 1997.

== See also ==
- List of Old Main buildings
