= Sioux City Masonic Temple =

- U.S. National Register of Historic Places
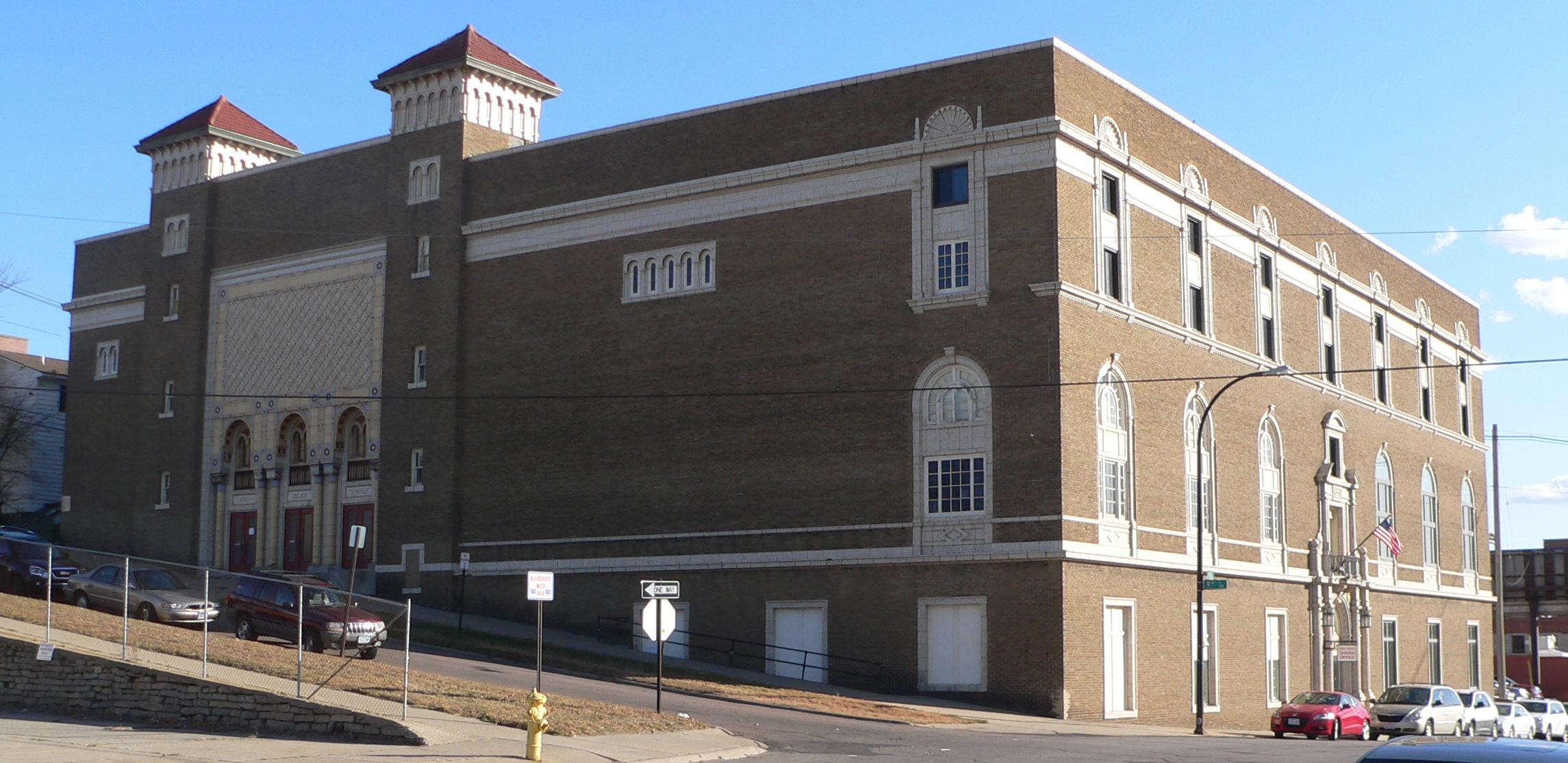
- View from northwest, across 9th and Nebraska

- Location within Iowa Location within the United States
- Location: 820 Nebraska St. Sioux City, Iowa
- Coordinates: 42°29′58″N 96°24′5″W
- Area: less than one acre
- Built: 1921-1922
- Architect: Buettler & Arnold
- Architectural style: Spanish Colonial Revival
- NRHP reference No.: 03001389
- Added to NRHP: January 14, 2004

The Sioux City Masonic Temple in Sioux City, Iowa was built during 1921–1922. It was listed on the National Register of Historic Places in 2004.

It is a two and a half or three story building that cost nearly $300,000 to build, not including nearly $200,000 of custom furnishings. In 2004 it was deemed significant as "an excellent, unaltered example of the Spanish Colonial Revival architectural design"; it was one of only two downtown commercial buildings in that style, which was popular during 1915 to 1940. The other is the NRHP-listed Sioux City Free Public Library, two blocks south. It was designed by Sioux City architects Beuttler and Arnold.
