= Beuttler & Arnold =

American architectural firm

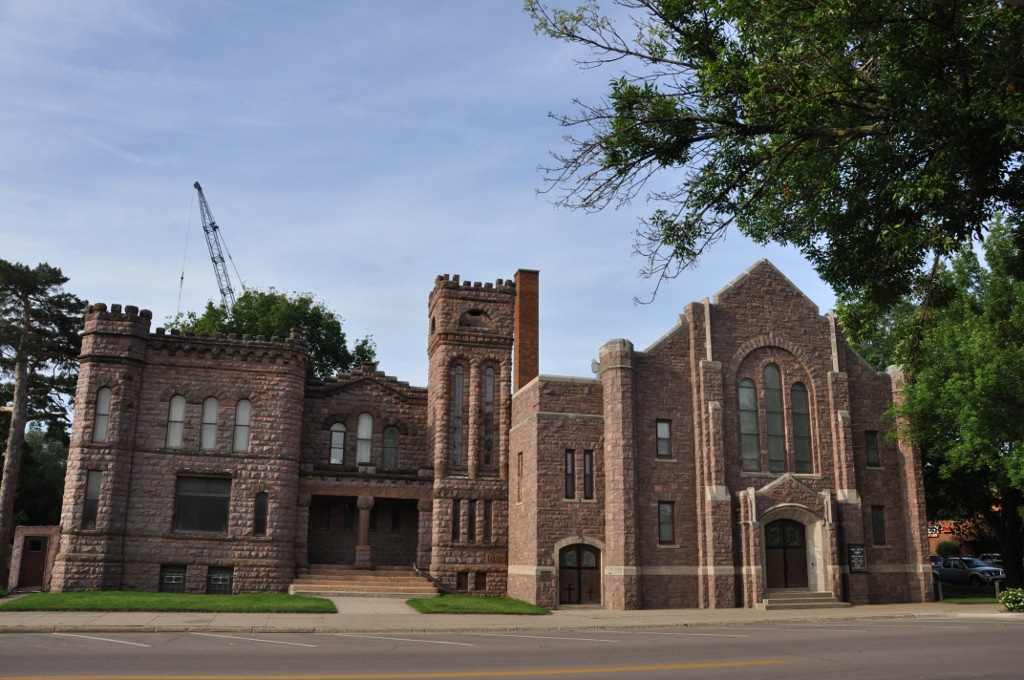
The First Baptist Church of Vermillion, South Dakota, designed by Beuttler & Arnold in the Byzantine Revival style and completed in 1925

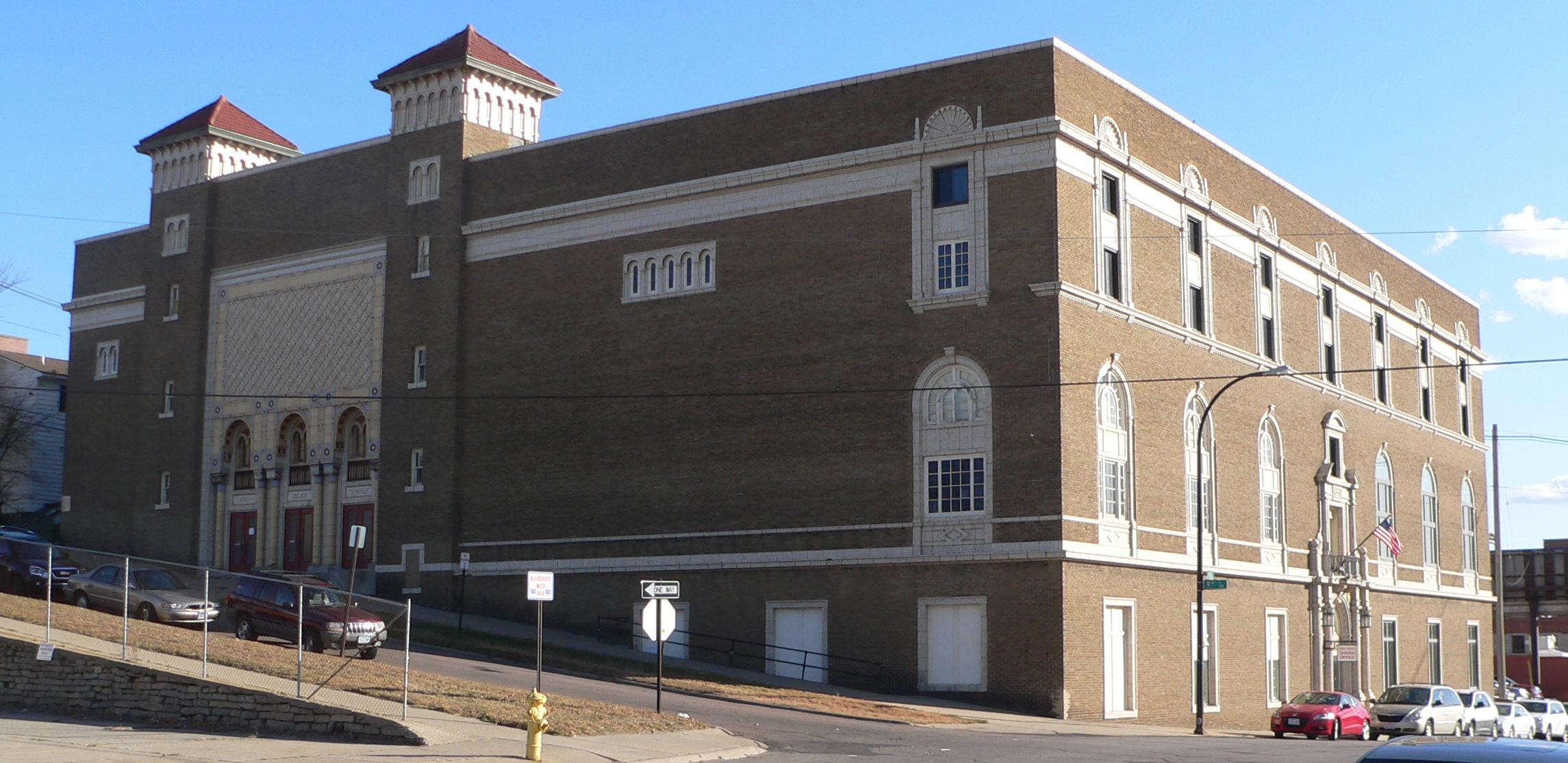
The Sioux City Masonic Temple, designed by Beuttler & Arnold in the Spanish Colonial Revival style and completed in 1922

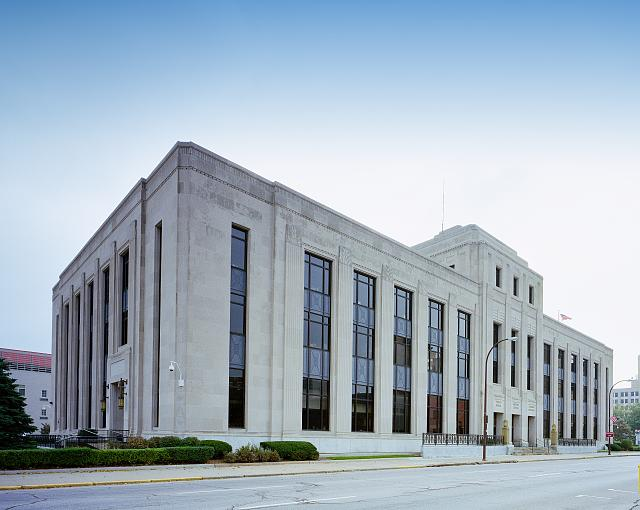
The Federal Building and United States Courthouse in Sioux City, designed by Beuttler & Arnold in the Moderne style and completed in 1934

Beuttler & Arnold was an architectural firm active in Sioux City, Iowa, during the first half of the twentieth century. It is the predecessor to CMBA Architects, a firm still active in Sioux City as of 2025.

== History ==
William Beuttler and Ralph Arnold established their partnership in 1912. They had met working in the office of Sioux City architect Wilfred W. Beach, a former partner of the better-known William L. Steele. They would work in partnership for nearly thirty years and had a successful regional practice which included nearby portions of Nebraska and South Dakota. In November 1941 Arnold was appointed architect of the Iowa Board of Control and the firm was dissolved.

During World War II Beuttler joined with local engineers Buell & Winter to design the Sioux City Army Air Base (1942). He returned to independent practice after the project was completed. In June 1941 Beuttler & Arnold had been one of four architectural firms selected to design the Lucas Building (1952), a state office building in Des Moines, working under chief architects Tinsley, McBroom & Higgins. The Stripped Classical building was delayed by the war and construction did not begin until 1949. In 1958 Beuttler formed the partnership of William Beuttler & Son with his son, W. Lee Beuttler, which continued until he died in 1963.

Under the leadership of the younger Beuttler the firm was successively known as William Lee Beuttler & Associates, Beuttler Associates and Beuttler Olsen Lee. In 1982 the firm was acquired by Duffy Mannes Brygger, a Sioux City architecture firm led by James M. Duffy, an employee of the Beuttler firm from 1953 to 1963. As of 2025 the combined firm is known as CMBA Architects and considers William Beuttler and Ralph Arnold to be their founders.

== Founding partners ==
William Beuttler (September 1, 1883 – April 20, 1963) was born in Hannibal, Missouri. He was educated at the former Dixon College and the Washington University in St. Louis, graduating from the latter in 1910. After a year working for the Burlington Railroad he moved to Sioux City in 1911. He died in Sioux City at the age of 79.

Ralph Arnold (October 2, 1889 – November 4, 1961) was born in Carbondale, Illinois. He was educated at the University of Illinois, graduating in 1911 with a BS. After 1941 he lived in Des Moines. He died in Des Moines at the age of 72.

== Architectural works ==
- 1913 – Florence Crittenton Home and Maternity Hospital, Sioux City, Iowa
  - Beuttler & Arnold designed the Maternity Home as an adjunct to the older Home, designed by Beach & Steele and completed in 1906. Formerly NRHP-listed but demolished after a fire.
- 1914 – Hickman-Johnson-Furrow Learning Center, Morningside University, Sioux City, Iowa
  - Originally built as the Alumni Gymnasium. A contributing resource to the NRHP-listed Morningside College Historic District.
- 1915 – Hartington Carnegie Library, Hartington, Nebraska
  - A Carnegie library. NRHP-listed. The also NRHP-listed Milo Public Library in Maine is a near duplicate of the Hartington Library. The Milo building committee inquired about, and may have purchased, plans of the building. Frederick A. Paterson of Bangor was the architect of record.
- 1915 – Security National Bank Building, Sioux City, Iowa
  - Originally known as the Trimble Block.
- 1916 – First United Methodist Church, Sioux City, Iowa
- 1917 – Sibley Public Library, Sibley, Iowa
  - A Carnegie library.
- 1920 – Sachse, Bunn & Company building, Cherokee, Iowa
  - A contributing property to the NRHP-listed Cherokee Commercial Historic District.
- 1922 – Sioux City Masonic Temple, Sioux City, Iowa
  - A rare local example of the Spanish Colonial Revival style. NRHP-listed.
- 1925 – First Baptist Church, Vermillion, South Dakota
  - Designed to complement the attached parish house and temporary sanctuary, designed by Wallace L. Dow and completed in 1890. NRHP-listed.
- 1926 – Dimmitt Hall, Morningside University, Sioux City, Iowa
  - A contributing resource to the NRHP-listed Morningside College Historic District.
- 1934 – Federal Building and United States Courthouse, Sioux City, Iowa
  - Designed by Beuttler & Arnold, architects, with Proudfoot, Rawson, Souers & Thomas of Des Moines, consulting architects, working under acting Supervising Architect James A. Wetmore. NRHP-listed.
