= Federal Building and United States Courthouse (Sioux City, Iowa) =

- United States Post Office and Courthouse
- U.S. National Register of Historic Places
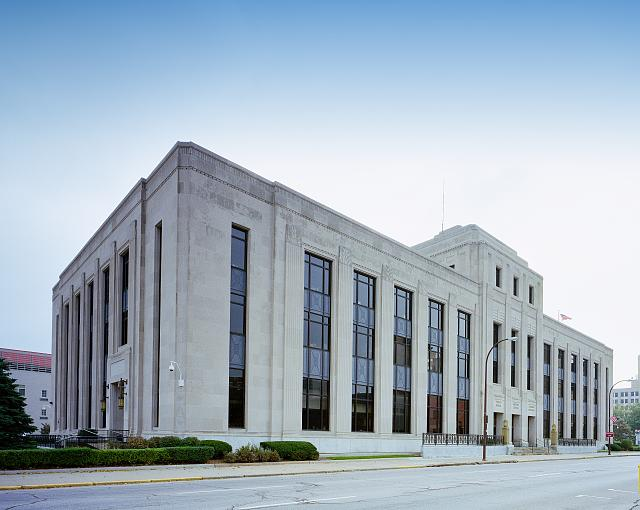

- Location within Iowa Location within the United States
- Location: 316-320 6th St. Sioux City, Iowa
- Coordinates: 42°29′45.7″N 96°24′25.8″W
- Area: less than one acre
- Built: 1934
- Architect: Beuttler & Arnold
- Architectural style: Moderne; Art Deco
- NRHP reference No.: 13000485
- Added to NRHP: July 17, 2013

The Federal Building and United States Courthouse is located in Sioux City, Iowa, United States. The present city hall in Sioux City was previously the post office, federal building and courthouse. This building replaced it. It was designed by the local architectural firm of Beuttler & Arnold with the Des Moines firm of Proudfoot, Rawson, Souers & Thomas providing input and oversight. Construction began in 1932 under the direction of the Acting Supervising Architect of the Treasury James A. Wetmore. The building was dedicated on December 29, 1933. The Federal Government had paid $270,000 for the property, and about $725,000 on construction. Architecturally, the three-story, stone structure is a combination of Stripped Classicism and Art Deco. The post office moved to a new facility in 1984, and additional office space and a new courtroom were created in the building. A further renovation was undertaken from 1999 to 2000 and a third courtroom a judge's chamber, jury deliberation room, library, and holding cell for defendants were added. The building was listed on the National Register of Historic Places in 2013.

== Building history ==
Sioux City was founded in the 1850s by Dr. John Cook as a trading post and docking point for steamships. As the river town grew, the population required an increasing number of federal services, and the city was selected as the location of a new post office, federal building, and courthouse to replace an existing federal building (currently used as City Hall). Construction commenced in 1932. Beuttler & Arnold, a renowned architectural firm responsible for numerous buildings in Sioux City, including the Masonic Temple, Methodist Hospital, YWCA, and East and West Junior High Schools, designed the building. The equally well-known architectural firm of Proudfoot, Rawson, Souers & Thomas of Des Moines was selected to provide input and oversight to the project. The building was constructed under the auspices of Acting Supervising Architect of the Treasury James A. Wetmore.

A site on the block bounded by Douglas, Pearl, Sixth, and Seventh streets was purchased for $270,000, and approximately $725,000 was spent on construction; in all, the costs totaled $100,000 less than anticipated. When the foundation was excavated by a steam shovel, workers who were unemployed as a result of the Great Depression protested in hope of convincing the government to revert to more the more traditional, labor-intensive method of using men with hand tools and horse-drawn equipment, but the mechanized method prevailed. The local press considered the building a great source of civic pride and monitored construction progress closely. The building was dedicated on December 29, 1933, with a local newspaper headline proclaiming "Postoffice is Uncle Sam's Gift to City."

When postal services moved to a new facility on Jackson Street in 1984, the building interior was modified to create additional office space and a new courtroom. During renovations from 1999 to 2000, another courtroom was added, along with other judicial rooms, including a judge's chamber, jury deliberation room, library, and holding cell for defendants. SiouxLandmark, a local historic preservation organization, praised the renovations and the U.S. General Services Administration's commitment to preserving this important downtown historic building.

== Architecture ==
The Federal Building and U.S. Courthouse is a skillful blend of the Stripped Classical and Art Deco styles of architecture, a combination that was commonly used for federal building design in the 1930s. The mixture adopted traditional classical forms of architecture while abandoning excessive ornament in favor of more subtle stylized decorative components that are typical of the Art Deco style. It is a refined building that conveys the dignity and stability of the federal government, which was particularly important during the Great Depression.

The building has an E-shaped footprint with a boxlike form and is three stories tall. A central stepped tower ascends above the roofline on the facade of the building. The building rests upon a five-foot base of granite quarried from Pine Mountain, Iowa, while the remainder is clad in light gray limestone ashlar from New Bedford, Indiana. A modest entablature with chevron (V-shaped) motifs, a dentil (rectangular block) course, and raised limestone coping tops the building.

Windows throughout the building are narrow vertical forms with embossed bronze spandrels between each story. Each opening is topped by a dentil course. Stylized fluted pilasters (attached columns) divide the window bays and are a classical feature. The pilaster capitals, however, contain a simplified floral design characteristic of Art Deco architecture. The entrances on the Sixth Street elevation are flanked by fluted pilasters with carved limestone capitals featuring a stylized eagle motif, which alludes to the federal presence.

The interior also displays many Art Deco components. The staircase features an exuberant Art Deco design with a cast-bronze ziggurat newel post and fluted bronze railing. The lobby is finished with light gray polished marble on the floors and walls, which are topped by an elaborate painted entablature with sunrise and chevron designs. The south wall of the lobby contains a series of openings originally used as postal service windows. Although most are now covered, they retain their original fluted bronze surrounds and bronze floral grilles that sit atop panels of Tennessee Appalachian coral marble.

The main courtroom, located on the third floor, contains restrained classically inspired ornament. Dark walnut wainscot panels rise ten feet up the walls. Some of the panels are punctuated by cast-bronze ventilation grilles with a scalloped pattern. Behind the judge's bench, a walnut panel with a shield is topped by a pediment. Beneath it is a metal plaque with an eagle design. An elaborate coffered plaster ceiling with leaf and dolphin designs is located in the courtroom, and original bronze pendant light fixtures are also present. The courtroom lobby floor is covered with small squares of Tennessee Appalachian golden vein marble that are grouped into larger squares with a central, diamond-shaped inset of black marble. Walls are also clad in golden-vein marble. Fluted marble pilasters topped with a gold star motif flank window and door openings. A plaster entablature surrounds the top of the room. Painted in terra cotta and sepia tones, it features geometric Art Deco motifs. Some offices retain original wood panel doors and surrounds, marble sills, and wood picture rails.

== Gallery ==
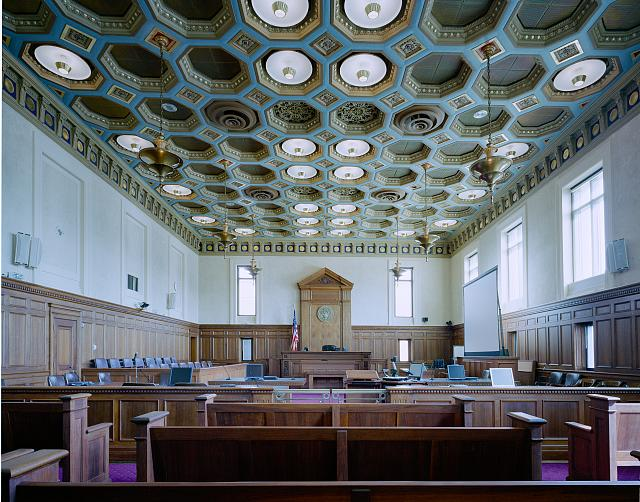
Courtroom

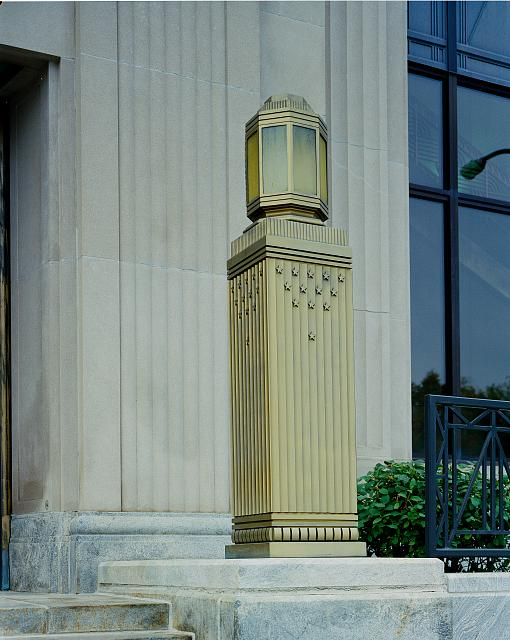
Front lamp

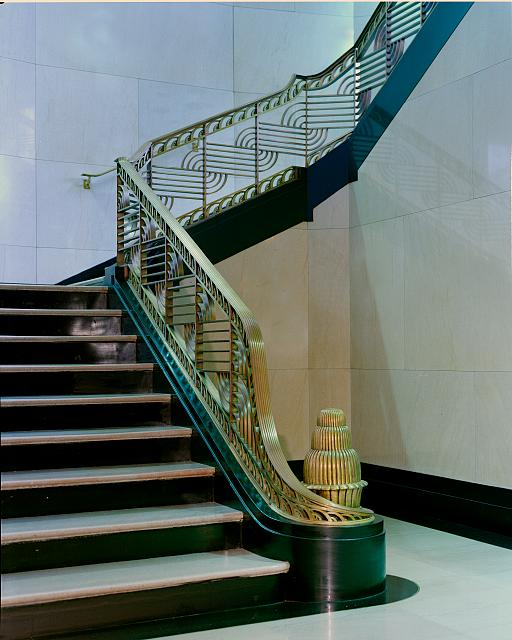
Interior staircase

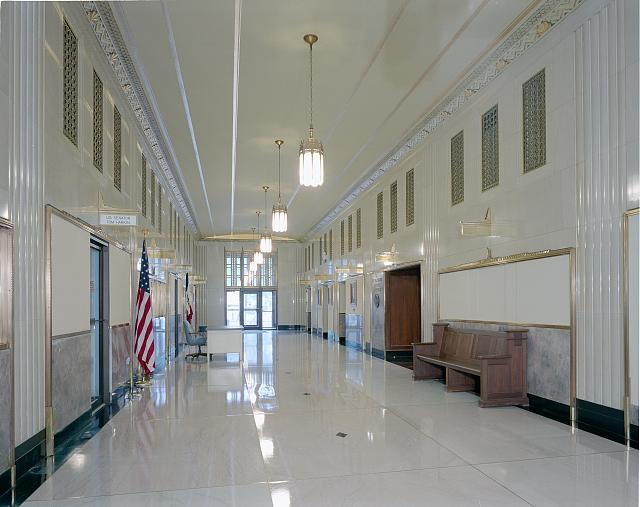
Lobby
