= Wallace L. Dow =

American architect

Wallace LeRoy Dow
- Born: September 21, 1844; Croydon, New Hampshire, U.S.
- Died: June 6, 1911 (aged 66); Sioux Falls, South Dakota, U.S.
- Occupation: Architect

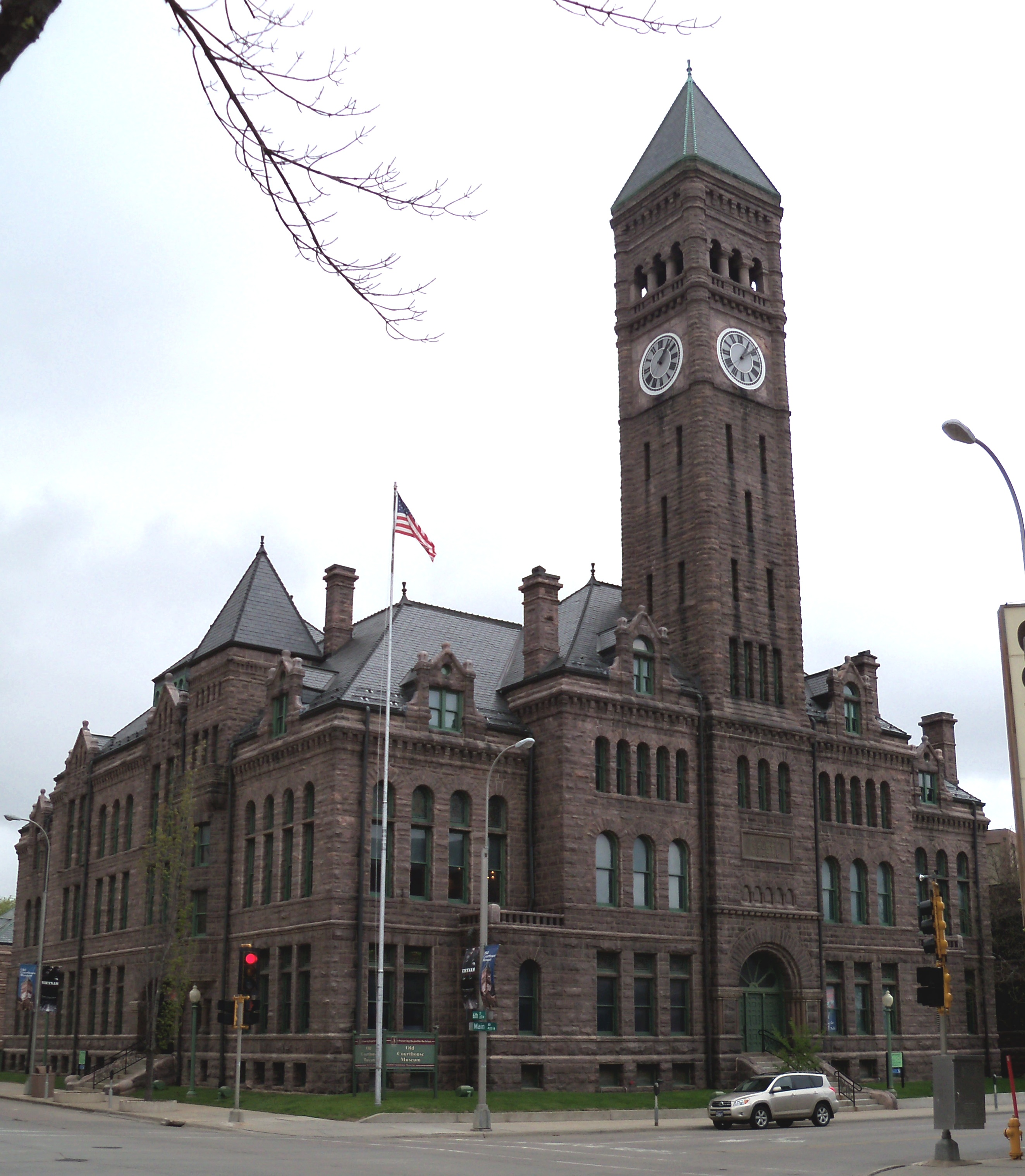
The former Minnehaha County Courthouse in Sioux Falls, designed by Dow in 1889 and completed in 1890, is one of the architect's most distinctive buildings.

Wallace L. Dow (September 21, 1844 – June 6, 1911), often known as W. L. Dow, was an American architect of Sioux Falls, South Dakota. He has been referred to as the "Builder on the Prairie" and was "considered the premier architect of South Dakota in the late 19th century."

== Life and career ==
Wallace LeRoy Dow was born in Croydon, New Hampshire, on September 21, 1844, the son of Hial Dow and Lura Powers Dow. Dow was educated in local schools and at the Powers Institute in Bernardston, Massachusetts. He learned the carpentry trade from his father, and worked in the plumbing and heating trades in the early 1860s in Massachusetts. In 1866 he returned to New Hampshire, settling in the town of Newport, immediately south of his birthplace. There, he formed the firm of W. L. Dow & Company, contractors, in association with his father and brother. As a contractor he built several buildings designed by his uncle, the architect Edward Dow, including the Newport Town Hall of 1872. In 1877 he joined his uncle's firm, Dow & Wheeler, to work as a superintendent and to study architecture. During this time he supervised construction of the New Hampshire State Prison for Men in Concord, which would prove to be useful experience.

In 1880 Dow and his brother, Wilbur A. Dow, left New Hampshire and went west, initially settling in Pierre, Dakota Territory. Construction in Pierre was minimal, but in February, 1881, Governor Nehemiah G. Ordway, a former New Hampshire state senator, appointed Dow architect of the new prison to be built at Sioux Falls. The brothers then relocated to Yankton, then the capital of the territory. Dow's prison at Sioux Falls was followed by a northern prison at Bismarck and other territorial commissions. In 1884 he relocated to Sioux Falls, the largest city in the territory. He designed many public buildings, and played an important role in development of the construction stone industry in the state. In 1899 he was joined in partnership by his eldest son, Edwin W. Dow, forming the firm of W. L. Dow & Son, which continued to be highly active until their retirement from architecture in 1905.

Dow was an early proponent of concrete construction. When he was commissioned to design the South Dakota building for the World's Columbian Exposition in Chicago, he designed a wood framed building clad entirely in precast concrete panels. In 1904 he patented a device for the manufacture of concrete block, and spent his later years operating and promoting the Perfection Block Machine Company.

== Personal life ==
In 1865 Dow was married to Lois M. Whipple of Croydon. They had three children who lived to adulthood, including two sons and one daughter. Their eldest child, Edwin W. Dow, was born in 1869 and would be associated with his father's business. Wallace L. Dow died July 6, 1911, in Sioux Falls.

== Legacy ==
The buildings that Dow designed were chiefly in the popular Revival styles of the day, including the Queen Anne, Richardsonian Romanesque and Colonial Revival styles. Many of these buildings utilize the distinctive Sioux Quartzite, noted for its pink and red color.

At least fourteen buildings designed by Dow have been listed on the United States National Register of Historic Places, though one has been demolished. Many others contribute to listed historic districts.

== Works ==
- South Dakota State Penitentiary, 1600 North Dr, Sioux Falls, South Dakota (1881–82 and 1884, NRHP 1978)
- Conservatory of Music, (Note: Dow acted as supervising architect for architect John M. Allen of New Bedford, Massachusetts. A contributing property to the Yankton College historic district, NRHP-listed in 1982.) Yankton College (former campus), Yankton, South Dakota (1882–84, NRHP 1972)
- North Dakota State Penitentiary, 3100 Railroad Ave, Bismarck, North Dakota (1883–84)
- Old Main, South Dakota School for the Deaf (former campus), (Note: A contributing property to the South Dakota School for the Deaf historic district, NRHP-listed in 1981.) Sioux Falls, South Dakota (1883)
- Old Main, University of South Dakota, Vermillion, South Dakota (1883–87, rebuilt 1894, NRHP 1973)
- All Saints School, (Note: A contributing property to the All Saints Historic District, NRHP-listed in 1984.) 101 W 17th St, Sioux Falls, South Dakota (1884, NRHP 1973)
- Classroom Building, South Dakota School for the Deaf (former campus), Sioux Falls, South Dakota (1884–85)
- House for Wallace L. Dow, 700 S First Ave, Sioux Falls, South Dakota (1885)
- Rock Island Depot (former), 201 E 10th St, Sioux Falls, South Dakota (1886, NRHP 1976)
- Peck-Norton-Murray Block, (Note: A contributing property to the Sioux Falls Downtown Historic District, NRHP-listed in 1994.) 120-122 S Phillips Ave, Sioux Falls, South Dakota (1887)
- Illinois Central Railroad passenger terminal (former), 200 N Cherapa Pl, Sioux Falls, South Dakota (1888)
- First Baptist Church, (Note: A contributing property to the Downtown Vermillion Historic District, NRHP-listed in 2003.) 101 E Main St, Vermillion, South Dakota (1889–90, NRHP 1982)
- Lincoln County Courthouse, 104 N Main St, Canton, South Dakota (1889–90)
- Minnehaha County Courthouse (former), (Note: A contributing property to the Old Courthouse and Warehouse Historic District, NRHP-listed in 1983.) 200 W 6th St, Sioux Falls, South Dakota (1889–90, NRHP 1973)
- House for George D. Dayton, 1311 Fourth Ave, Worthington, Minnesota (1890, NRHP 2003)
- Phillips Block, 335 S Main Ave, Sioux Falls, South Dakota (1891–92, NRHP 1978)
- Willey & Williams Building, 330 N Main Ave, Sioux Falls, South Dakota (1891)
- South Dakota Building, World's Columbian Exposition, Chicago, Illinois (1893, temporary building)
- Main Hall, University of South Dakota at Springfield (former campus), Springfield, South Dakota (1896, NRHP 1981, demolished 2004)
- Kingsbury County Courthouse, 202 Second Ave, De Smet, South Dakota (1898–99, NRHP 1977)
- Double house for Wallace L. Dow and Edwin W. Dow, 704-706 S First Ave, Sioux Falls, South Dakota (1900)
- Douglas County Clerk of Courts and Auditor's Office (former), (Note: A contributing property to the Douglas County Courthouse and Auditor's Office, NRHP-listed in 1978.) 710 Braddock St, Armour, South Dakota (1902)
- House for William G. Milne, 508 E 9th St, Dell Rapids, South Dakota (1902, NRHP 1994)
- Mitchell Carnegie Library, 119 W Third Ave, Mitchell, South Dakota (1902)
- Yankton Carnegie Library (former), 401 Capital St, Yankton, South Dakota (1902–03, NRHP 1979)
- Graham Hall, Dakota Wesleyan University, (Note: Formerly a contributing property to the Dakota Wesleyan University historic district, NRHP-listed in 1976.) Mitchell, South Dakota (1903, demolished)
- Pierre Carnegie Library, 110 E Capitol Ave, Pierre, South Dakota (1905, burned 1995)
- South Dakota Central Railway depot, (Note: Later relocated to the Prairie Village museum near Madison.) 2nd St W, Wentworth, South Dakota (1905–06, moved)
- House for Gottlieb Scheurenbrand, (Note: Built as the home of a mason and contractor using Dow's "Perfection" concrete block system.) 700 E Hanson St, Mitchell, South Dakota (1906, NRHP 2018)

== Gallery ==
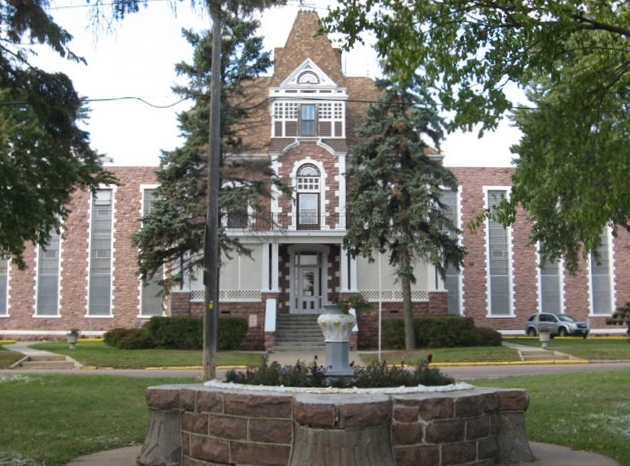
South Dakota State Penitentiary Building, Sioux Falls, South Dakota

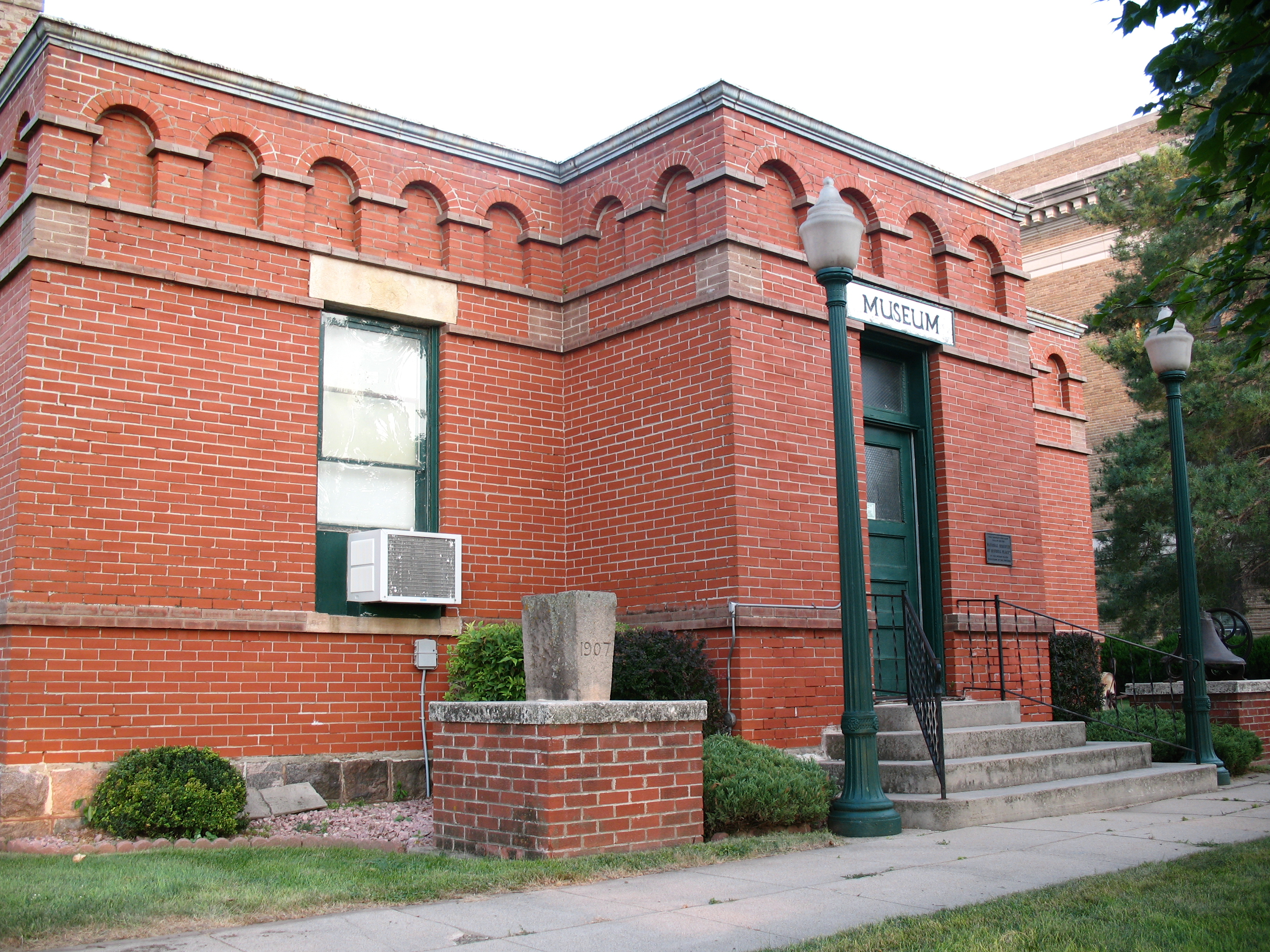
Douglas County Clear of Courts and Auditor's building, Armour, South Dakota, now the county museum

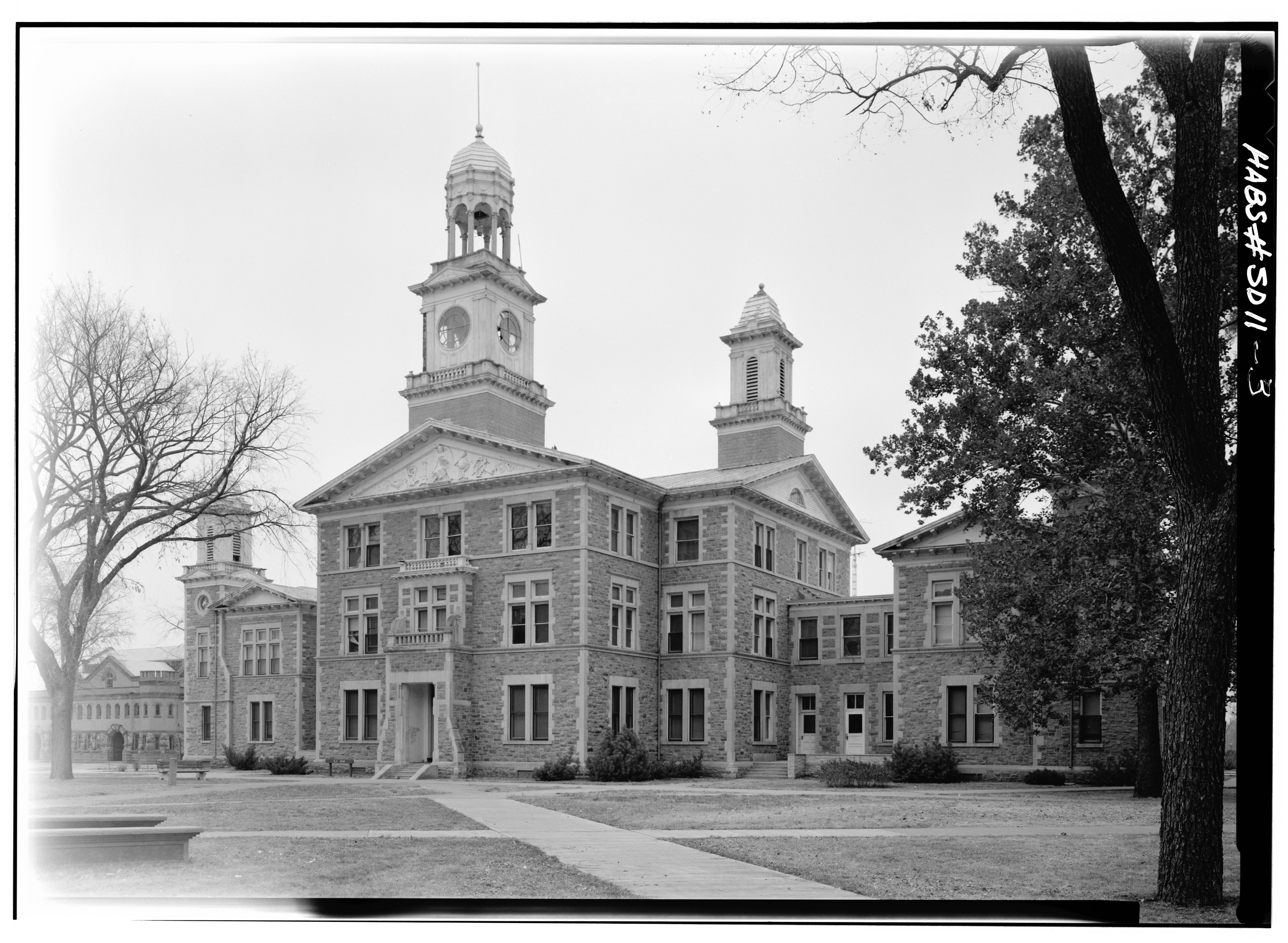
University Hall, University of South Dakota, Vermillion

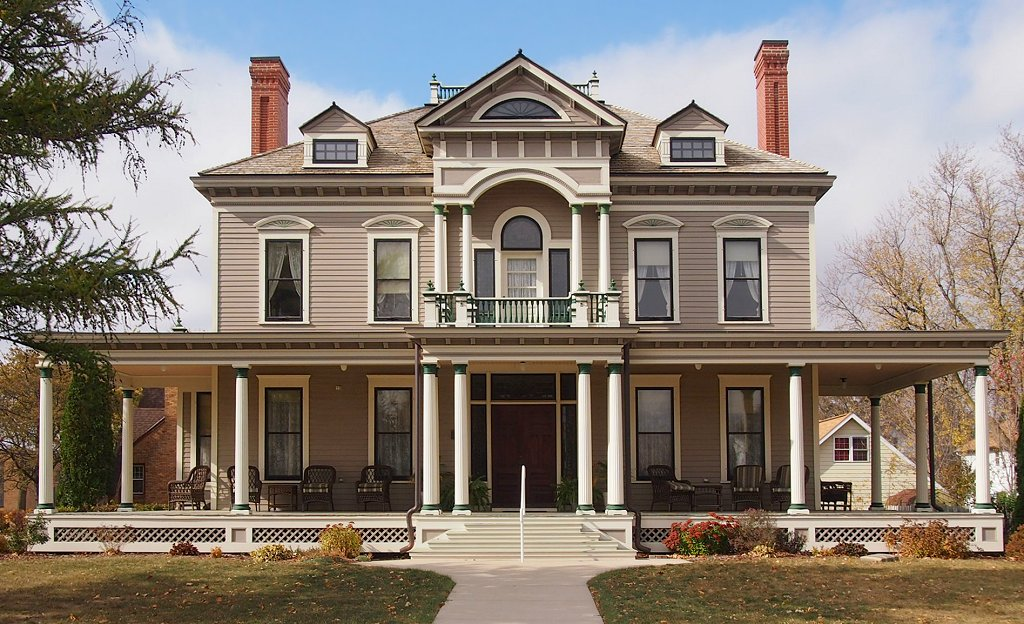
George D. Dayton House, Worthington, Minnesota

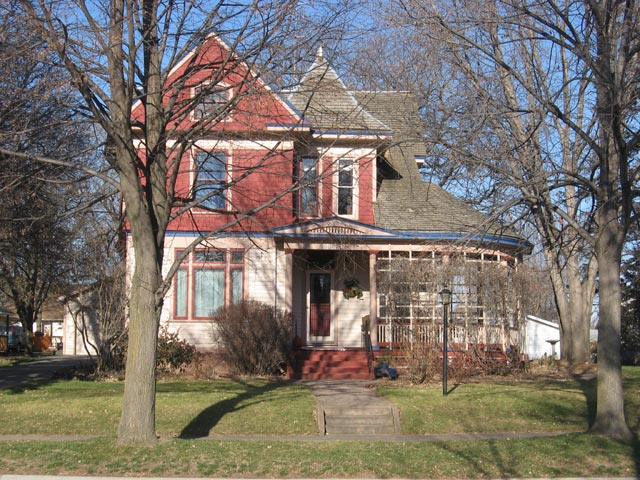
William G. Milne House, Dell Rapids, South Dakota

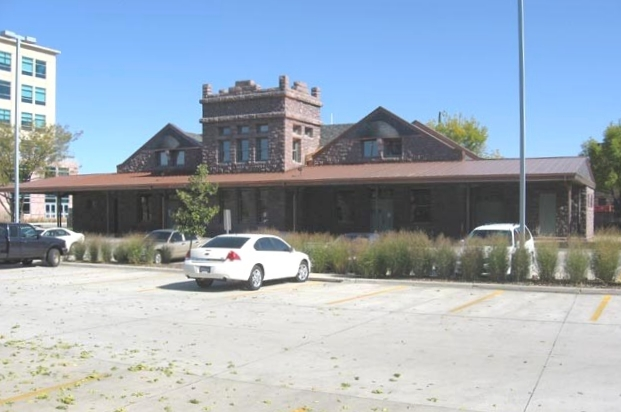
Illinois Central Terminal, Sioux Falls, South Dakota

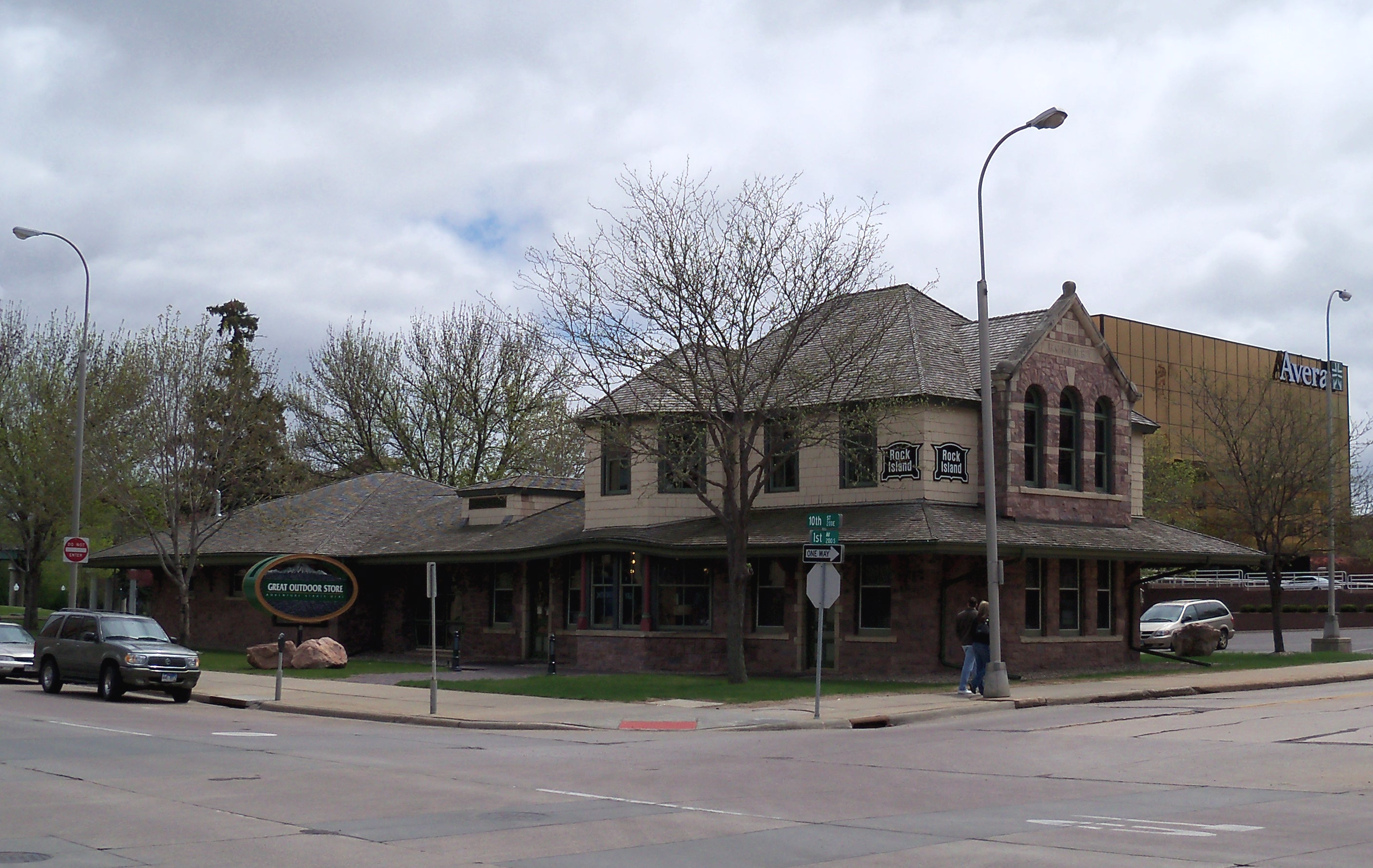
Rock Island Passenger Terminal, Sioux Falls, South Dakota

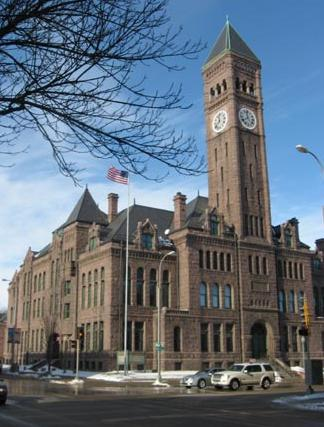
Old Minnehaha County Courthouse, Sioux Falls, South Dakota

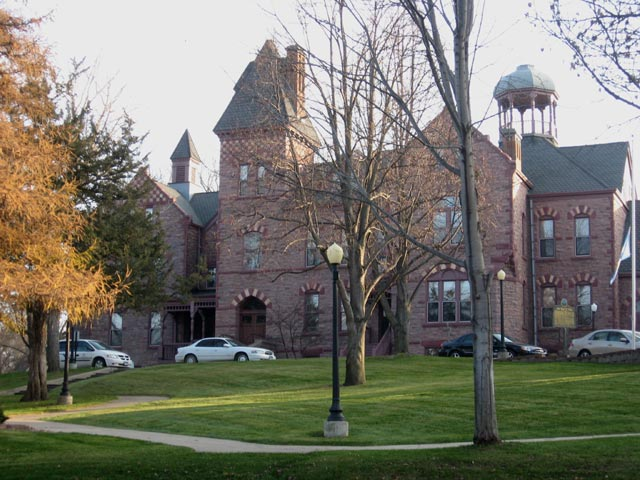
All Saints School, Sioux Falls, South Dakota
