= George D. Dayton House =

Historic house in Minnesota, United States

- George Draper Dayton House
- U.S. National Register of Historic Places
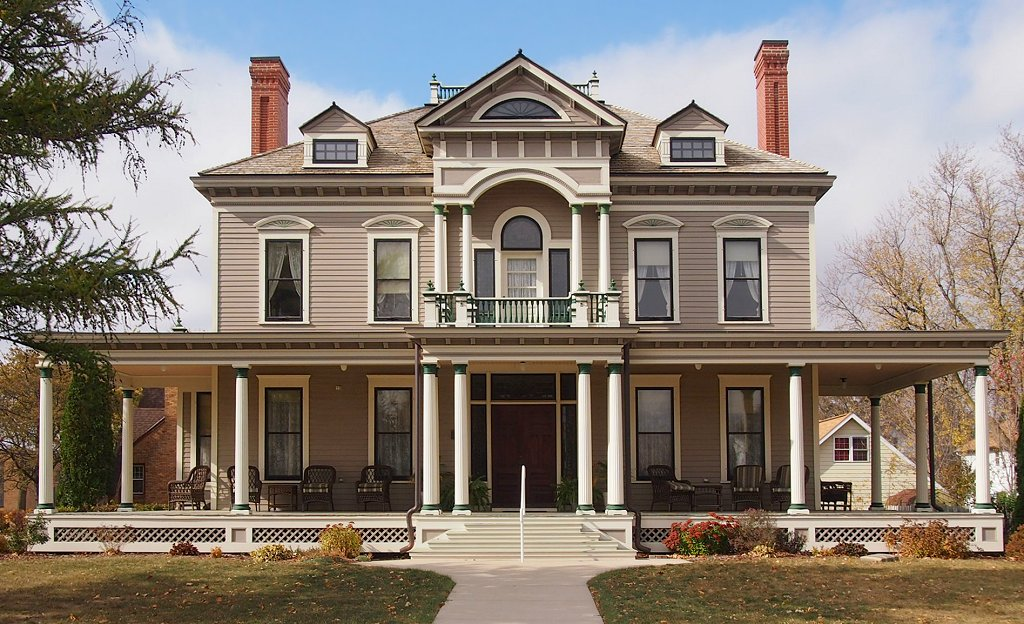

- Location within Minnesota Location within the United States
- Location: Worthington, Minnesota
- Coordinates: 43°37′23.2″N 95°35′37.7″W
- Built: 1890
- Architect: Wallace L. Dow
- Architectural style: Colonial Revival/Georgian Revival
- NRHP reference No.: 03001336
- Added to NRHP: December 23, 2003

The George Draper Dayton House was built in 1890 in Worthington, Minnesota, United States. George Dayton hired the Sioux Falls architect Wallace L. Dow to design his grand home on a parcel that took up eight lots.

== George Dayton ==
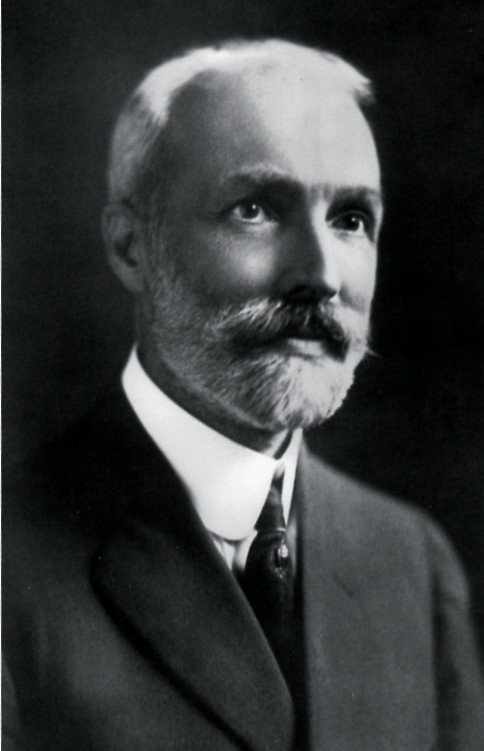
George Draper Dayton

George Dayton (1857-1938) came to Minnesota from New York in 1883. His family was one of average means, and he had hoped to become a minister, but was lured by the urge to be in the business world. He married Emma Chadwick in 1878 and began buying farm mortgages in southwest Minnesota. In 1883 he and his family moved to Worthington, Minnesota, where he was able to build wealth in the growing economy.

He presided over the Bank of Worthington and founded the Minnesota Loan and Investment Company, advancing his social status and prosperity. Dayton continued to live by his religious principles by improving his community and dedicating himself to the service of others; he served on the Worthington Board of Education, and was church clerk, elder, and trustee of Westminster Presbyterian Church, teaching Sunday school and hosting church events at his home.

== Architecture ==
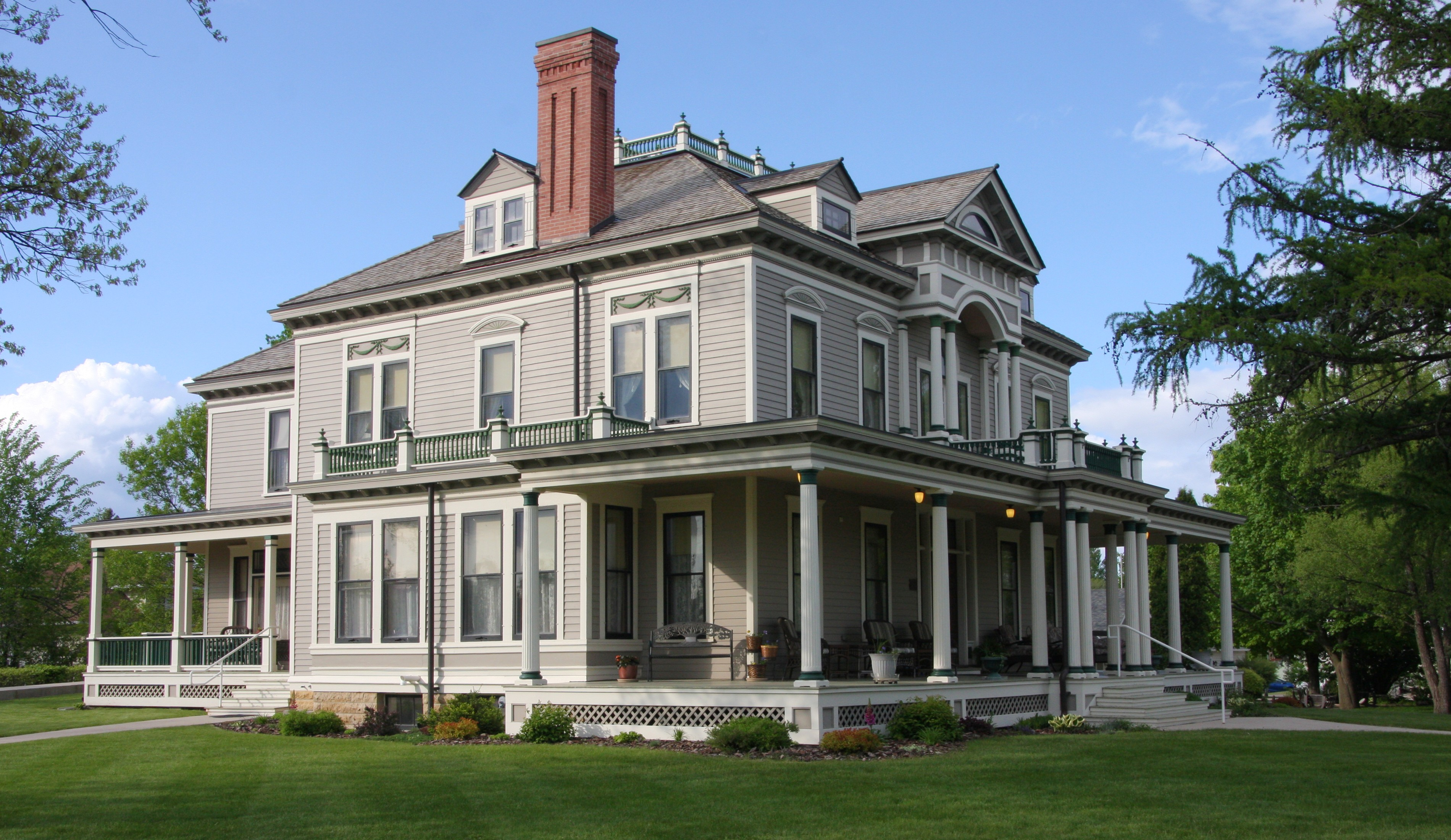
The house from the side

The home features a large front porch with columns supporting the overhanging roof, supported by brackets and complemented by dentil moulding, and balcony above, accented by a Palladian-style leaded-glass window. The shake roof is interrupted by large dormers, three chimneys, and a widow's walk. The frieze above the second-floor windows are decorated with ornamental swags.

The cherry front door is topped by a leaded glass transom and flanked by leaded glass sidelights. Woodwork includes cherry and oak pocket doors, mosaic wood flooring, carved banisters, and carved fretwork above the grand staircase.

== History ==
Dayton House original blueprint

When the Daytons moved to Minneapolis in 1902 to found Dayton's Dry Goods store (later to become Dayton's department store), the home was sold to Florence and Charles Smallwood. Florence's father, Justin Pierce Moulton had been a business partner of Dayton's. The Smallwoods lived in the home until 1921, when it was inherited by Mary Emmaline Smallwood, who was married to State Senator John Cashel. After Mary died in 1931, Cashel married Ruth Gertz. Following John Cashel's death in 1938, Ruth converted the home to a nursing home and operated it for 50 years, during which time much of the original interior was distorted. In 2002 a non-profit historic preservation group purchased the building for $150,000. Restoration costs were approximately $2,000,000 and it is now operated as a bed and breakfast and available for receptions.
