= William G. Milne House =

Historic house in South Dakota, United States

- U.S. National Register of Historic Places
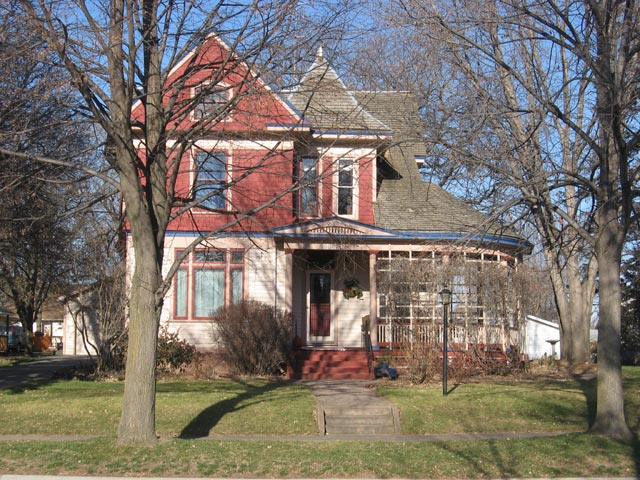
- William G. Milne House

- Location within South Dakota Location within the United States
- Location: 508 E. 9th St., Dell Rapids, South Dakota
- Coordinates: 43°49′42″N 96°42′30″W
- Area: less than one acre
- Built: 1902
- Architect: W. L. Dow & Son
- Architectural style: Queen Anne
- NRHP reference No.: 94001391
- Added to NRHP: December 1, 1994

The William G. Milne House at 508 E. 9th St. in Dell Rapids, South Dakota was built in 1902. It was designed by W. L. Dow & Son in Queen Anne style. It has also been known as Norgaard House and as Peterson House. It was listed on the National Register of Historic Places in 1994.

The house is a two-and-a-half-story wood-frame house with a rounded porch.
