= Old Minnehaha County Courthouse =

- U.S. National Register of Historic Places
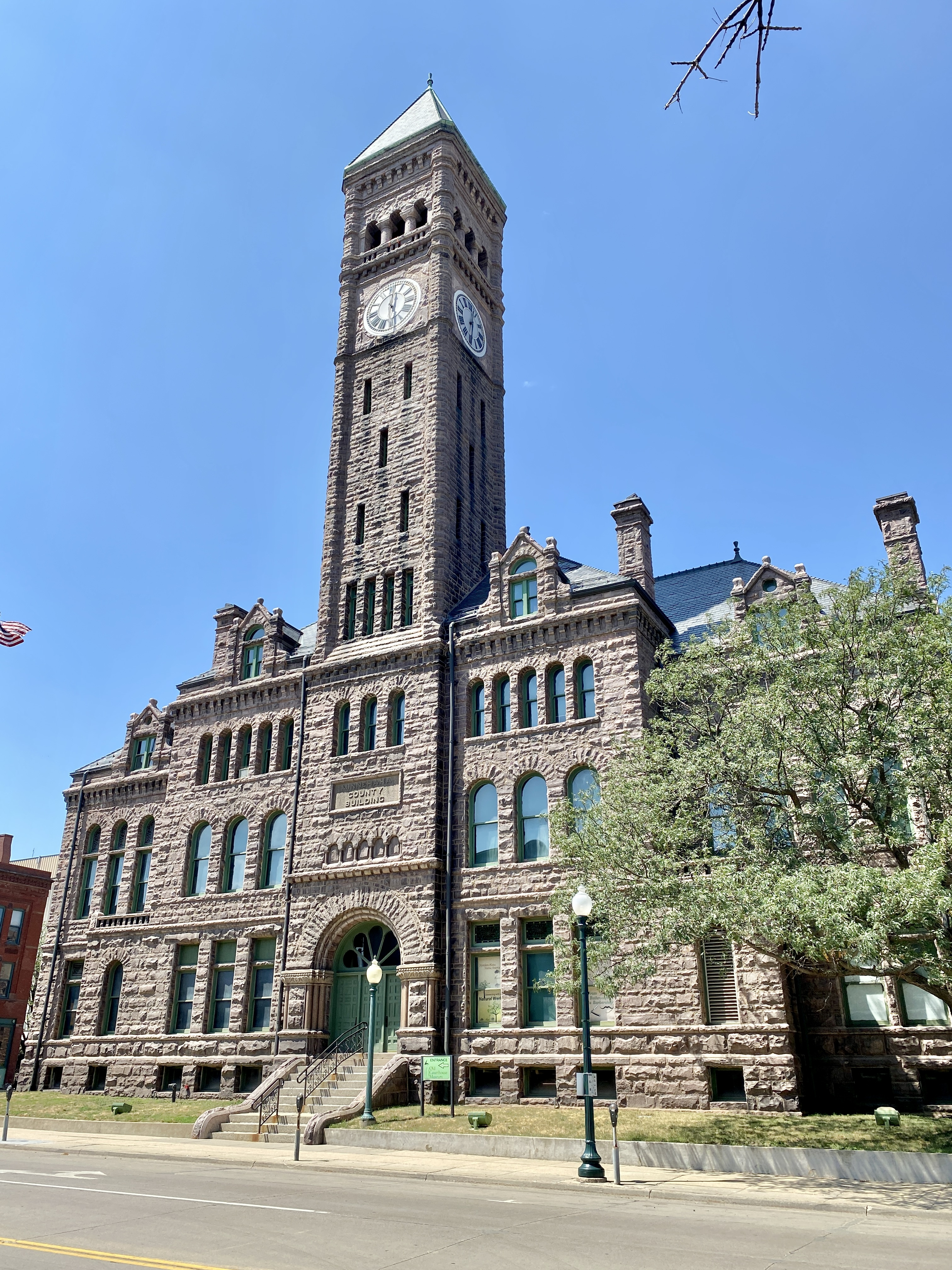

- Location within South Dakota Location within the United States
- Interactive map showing the location of Old Minnehaha County Courthouse
- Location: Main Ave. at 6th St., Sioux Falls, South Dakota
- Coordinates: 43°33′6″N 96°43′43″W
- Area: less than one acre
- Built: 1890
- Architect: Wallace L. Dow
- Architectural style: Richardsonian Romanesque
- NRHP reference No.: 73001749
- Added to NRHP: May 10, 1973

The Old Minnehaha County Courthouse, located at Main Avenue and 6th Street in Sioux Falls, is the former county courthouse of Minnehaha County, South Dakota.

The courthouse, which was the seat of county government from 1890 to 1962, is one of the oldest buildings in Sioux Falls. The Richardsonian Romanesque building was designed by local architect Wallace L. Dow and built from locally quarried quartzite, a common building material in Sioux Falls at the time. The three-story building features a tall clock tower over the front entrance. The building's doorways are surrounded by Roman archways; the second- and third-story windows are also arched, while the first-story windows are rectangular. The attic windows have decorative dormers aligned with the front walls.

The courthouse was added to the National Register of Historic Places on May 10, 1973.

== Old Courthouse Museum ==
The building is now operated as the Old Courthouse Museum by the Siouxland Heritage Museums Alliance. There are three floors of exhibits about area history and culture, including railroads, Native American artistry and culture, life traveling on the prairie, county towns, the American flag and chairs.
