= George Dayton =

American businessman and philanthropist

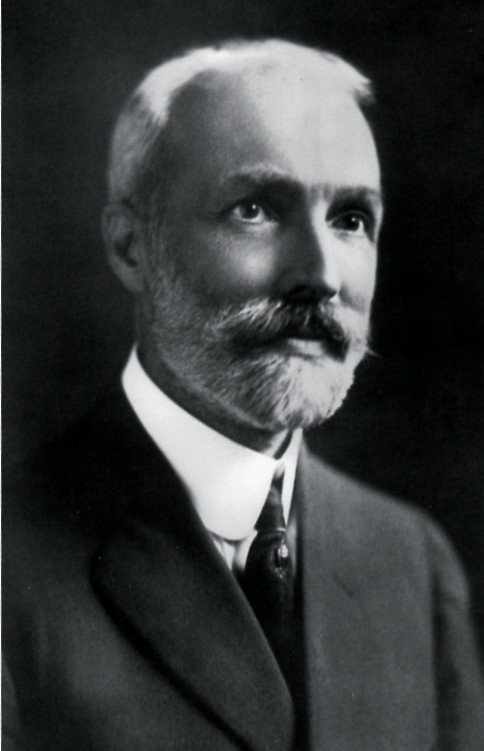
- George Dayton in his office portrait
- Born: George Draper Dayton; March 6, 1857; Clifton Springs, New York, U.S.
- Died: February 18, 1938 (aged 80); Minneapolis, Minnesota, U.S.
- Resting place: Lakewood Cemetery, Minneapolis; 44°56′10″N 93°17′57″W
- Occupation: Entrepreneur
- Political party: Republican
- Relatives: Bruce Dayton (grandson); Douglas Dayton (grandson); Mark Dayton (great-grandson)

George Draper Dayton (March 6, 1857 – February 18, 1938) was an American businessman and philanthropist, most famous for being the founder of Dayton's department store, which later launched the Target Corporation.

== Life and career ==
Dayton was born in Clifton Springs, New York, the son of Caroline Wesley (Draper) and David Day Dayton. In 1883, he moved to Minnesota, migrating from New York. His family was one of average means and he had hoped to become a minister, but was lured into the business world. He married Emma Chadwick in 1878 and began buying farm mortgages in southwest Minnesota. In 1883 he and his family moved to Worthington, Minnesota where he was able to build wealth in the growing economy.

He presided over the Bank of Worthington and founded the Minnesota Loan and Investment Company, advancing his social status and prosperity. In 1890 he built a large home on eight lots, designed by Sioux Falls architect Wallace Dow.

He was also a donor to and trustee of Macalester College in Saint Paul, Minnesota, where George Draper Dayton Hall is named in his honor.

Dayton continued to live by his religious principles by improving his community and dedicating himself to the service of others; he served on the Worthington Board of Education, and was church clerk, elder, and trustee of Westminster Presbyterian Church, teaching Sunday School and hosting church events at his home.

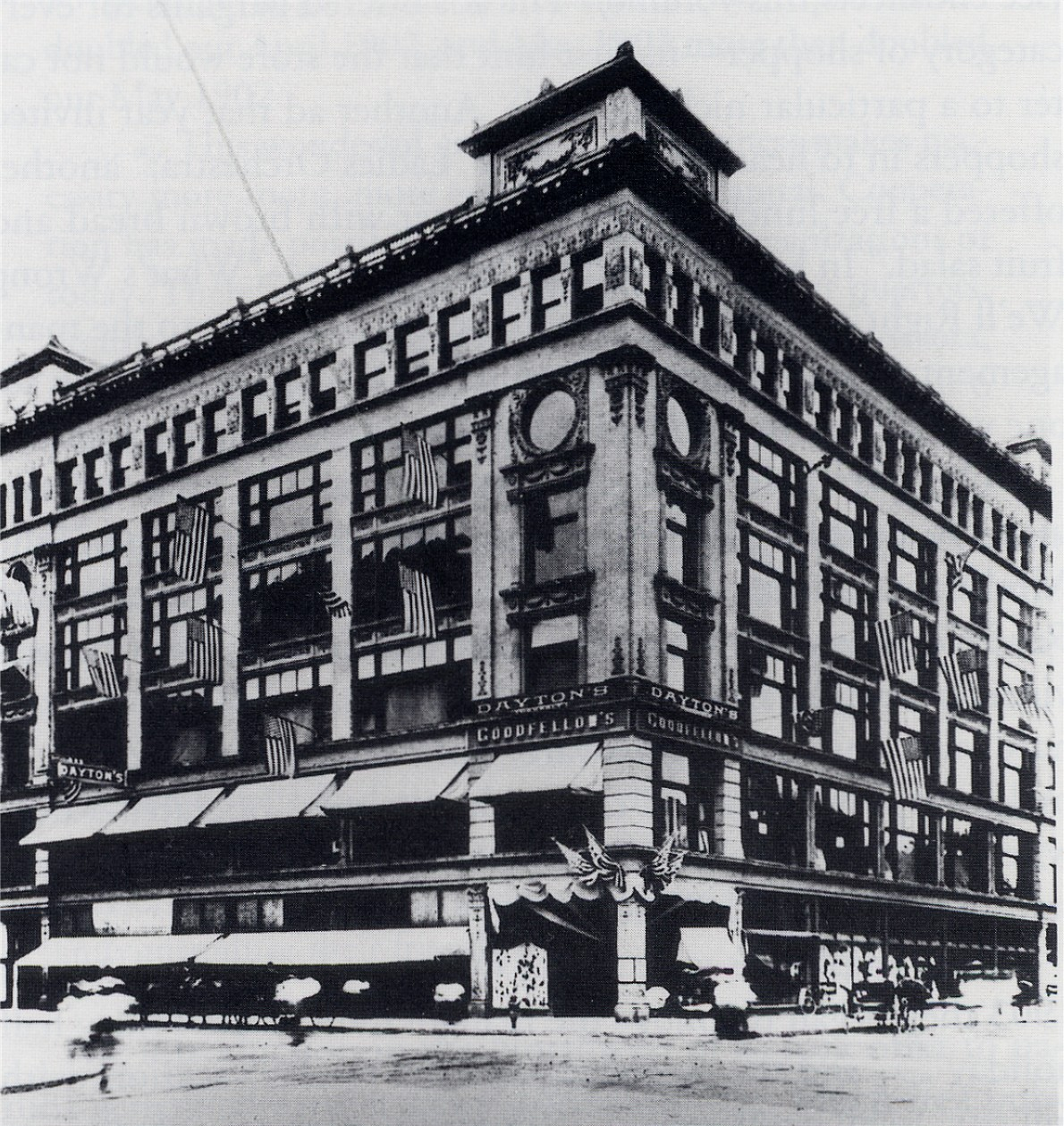
Dayton's Department Store in 1903

In 1902 he purchased land on Nicollet Avenue in Minneapolis and purchased Goodfellow & Co. which he reorganized as Dayton's Dry Goods store, later to become Dayton's department store. Dayton's dedication to service continued after his move to Minneapolis, where he continued to donate significant sums of money to the Worthington church and establishing The Dayton Foundation, dedicated to promoting the welfare of mankind. In 1926, he served on the finance committee for the Community Fund, a predecessor of today's United Way. Dayton's sons David Draper Dayton (1880–1923) and George Nelson Dayton (1886–1950) continued their father's business and his commitment to the community.

In 1956, the Daytons built Southdale Center in Edina, Minnesota. In 1962 the Daytons began the Target discount store chain.

George Nelson Dayton was great-grandfather to Mark Dayton, former U.S. Senator and Governor of Minnesota.

George Draper Dayton died of cancer in Minneapolis, Minnesota on February 18, 1938, at the age of 80. He was buried at Minneapolis' Lakewood Cemetery.
