= First Baptist Church of Vermillion =

Historic church in South Dakota, United States

- U.S. National Register of Historic Places
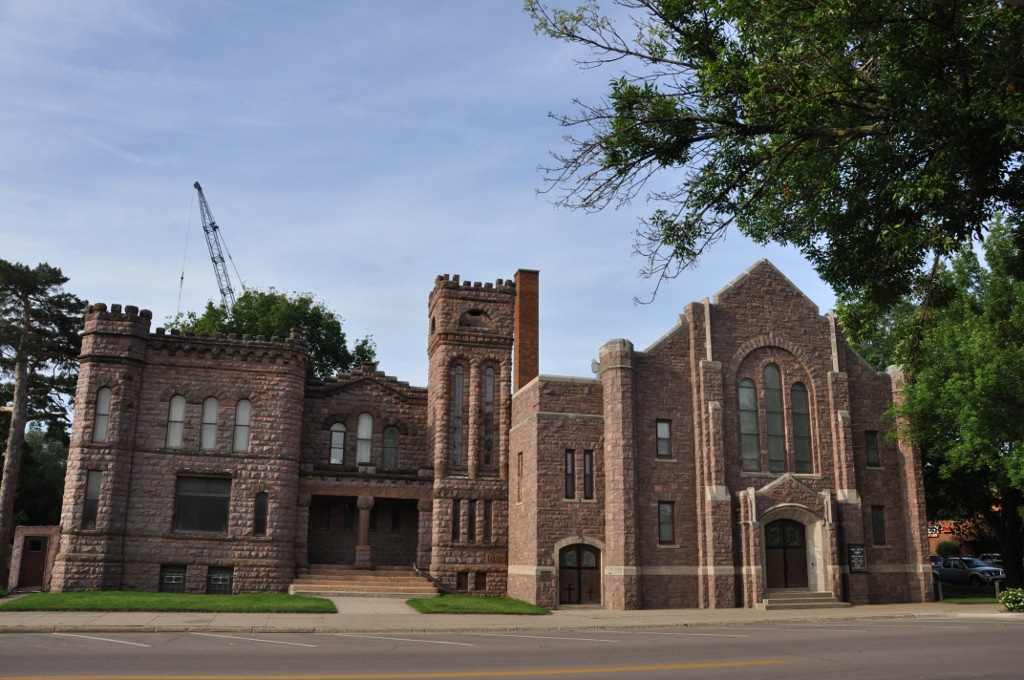

- Location within South Dakota Location within the United States
- Location: 101 E. Main St., Vermillion, South Dakota
- Coordinates: 42°46′44″N 96°55′49″W
- Area: 1 acre (0.40 ha)
- Built: 1889–90, 1925
- Architect: Wallace Le Roy Dow; Beuttler and Arnold
- Architectural style: Richardsonian Romanesque
- NRHP reference No.: 82003921
- Added to NRHP: March 5, 1982

First Baptist Church of Vermillion is a historic church in Vermillion, South Dakota. It was added to the National Register in 1982.

It was deemed significant for the architecture of its original wing, designed by Wallace LeRoy Dow and built during 1889–90. The second wing, designed by Beuttler and Arnold of Sioux City, Iowa, was designed to match, in 1924.
