= South Dakota School for the Deaf =

Public school in Sioux Falls, South Dakota, US

South Dakota Services for the Deaf

Location
- 4101 W 38th St., Suite 101; Sioux Falls, South Dakota 57106; 43°32′50″N 96°42′06″W

Information
- Type: Public
- Established: 1880
- State Aid: $3,517,946
- Website: SDSD's official website

The South Dakota Services for the Deaf (SDSD) is a state agency that supports deaf children in South Dakota. Formerly it was a state-supported school located in Sioux Falls, South Dakota that provided services to meet the educational needs of children who are deaf, hard-of-hearing, or have cochlear implants. SDSD is governed by the South Dakota Board of Regents.

SDSD was founded in 1880 as the Dakota Territorial School for Deaf Mutes when the area was still part of the Dakota Territory. When South Dakota became a state in 1889, the school was placed under the state's Board of Charities and Corrections and the name changed to its present form. In 1944, voters ratified an amendment to the state constitution which moved SDSD and the South Dakota School for the Blind (now the South Dakota School for the Blind and Visually Impaired) under the care of the South Dakota Board of Regents.

The student population reached a peak of 100-150 students by the 1960s; advances in hearing aid technology made it possible for hard of hearing students to stay in regular classes and various disability-related laws passed between the 1970s and 1990s led to increased placement of deaf students in public school environments rather than sending them to SDSD. The result was a gradual decline to about 50 students by the mid-1990s. This combined with the prevailing attitude of the Regents towards deafness led to the establishment of the current auditory / oral (cochlear implant) program and later, the transfer of both this and the original sign language-based program to neighboring school districts, leading to the closure of the main campus in 2011. The campus was sold, the remaining functions (administration and outreach) relocated to the South Dakota Department of Health Sioux Falls office.

Shelly Conlon of The Argus Leader in Sioux Falls stated that the decline and closure of SDSD and the placement of the burden on local school districts to educate deaf children reflected a negligence of deaf children from South Dakota state legislators.

== Campus ==
It had dormitories until 2005, when they closed. Disability Rights Services South Dakota legal director John Hamilton stated that the closure of dormitories caused the school to go into decline as students in many parts of the state could no longer attend the school.
