= Outline of South Dakota =

U.S. state

The flag of South Dakota

The seal of South Dakota

The location of the State of South Dakota in the United States of America

The following outline is provided as an overview of and topical guide to South Dakota:

South Dakota – 40th state located in the Midwestern region of the United States. It is named after the Lakota and Dakota Sioux American Indian tribes. South Dakota is the 17th most extensive, but the 5th least populous, and the 5th least densely populated of the 50 United States. Once the southern portion of the Dakota Territory, South Dakota became a state on November 2, 1889, simultaneously with North Dakota. Pierre is the state capital and Sioux Falls, with a population of 159,000, is South Dakota's most populous city.

== General reference ==
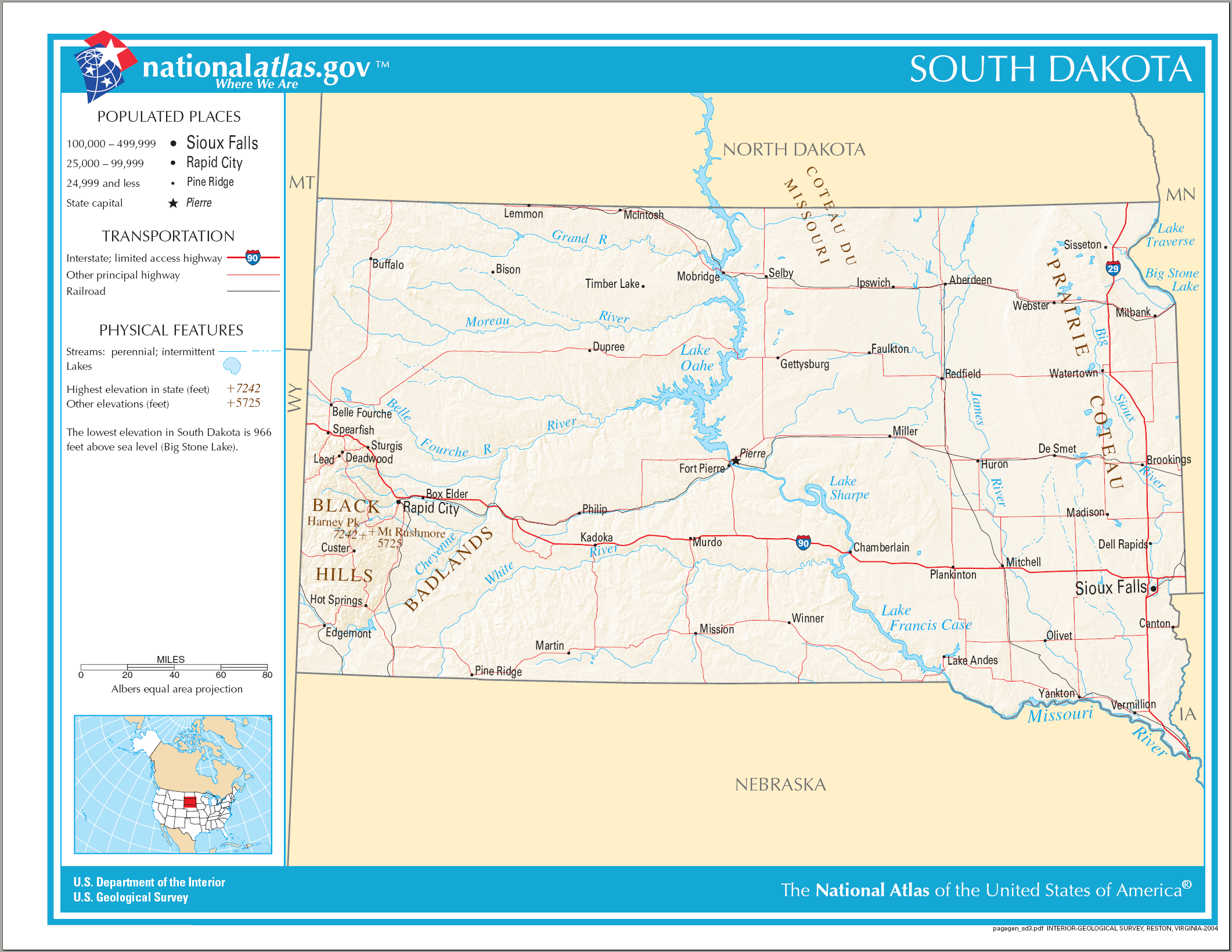
An enlargeable map of the State of South Dakota

- Names
  - Common name: South Dakota
    - Pronunciation: /dəˈkoʊtə/
  - Official name: State of South Dakota
  - Abbreviations and name codes
    - Postal symbol: SD
    - ISO 3166-2 code: US-SD
    - Internet second-level domain: .sd.us
  - Nicknames
    - Artesian State
    - Blizzard State
    - Coyote State
    - Land of Infinite Variety
    - Mount Rushmore State (officially adopted in 1980 in place of the former nickname of Sunshine State)
    - Sunshine State
- Adjectivals: South Dakota, South Dakotan
- Demonym: South Dakotan

== Geography of South Dakota ==
Geography of South Dakota

- South Dakota is: a U.S. state, a federal state of the United States of America
- Location
  - Northern Hemisphere
  - Western Hemisphere
    - Americas
      - North America
        - Anglo America
        - Northern America
          - United States of America
            - Contiguous United States
              - Central United States
                - West North Central States
                  - The Dakotas
              - Midwestern United States
          - Great Plains
- Population of South Dakota: 814,180 (2010 U.S. Census)
- Area of South Dakota: 77,116 sq mi (199,729 km^{2})
- Atlas of South Dakota

=== Places in South Dakota ===
Places in South Dakota

- Historic places in South Dakota
  - Abandoned communities in South Dakota
    - Ghost towns in South Dakota
  - National Historic Landmarks in South Dakota
  - National Register of Historic Places listings in South Dakota
    - Bridges on the National Register of Historic Places in South Dakota
- National Natural Landmarks in South Dakota
- National parks in South Dakota
- State parks in South Dakota

=== Environment of South Dakota ===
- Climate of South Dakota
- Superfund sites in South Dakota
- Wildlife of South Dakota
  - Fauna of South Dakota
    - Birds of South Dakota
    - Reptiles
      - Snakes of South Dakota

==== Natural geographic features of South Dakota ====
- Lakes of South Dakota
- Mountains of South Dakota
- Rivers of South Dakota

=== Regions of South Dakota ===
==== Administrative divisions of South Dakota ====
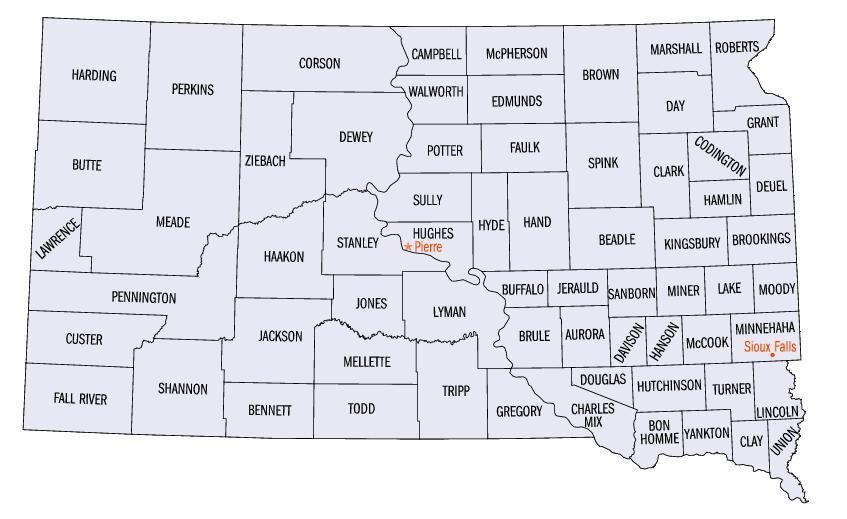
An enlargeable map of the 66 counties of the State of South Dakota

- The 66 Counties of the State of South Dakota
  - Municipalities in South Dakota
    - Cities in South Dakota
      - State capital of South Dakota: Pierre
      - Largest city in South Dakota: Sioux Falls
      - City nicknames in South Dakota
    - Towns in South Dakota
  - List of townships in South Dakota

=== Demography of South Dakota ===
Demographics of South Dakota

- South Dakota locations by per capita income

== Government and politics of South Dakota ==
Politics of South Dakota

- Form of government: U.S. state government
- South Dakota's congressional delegations
- South Dakota State Capitol
- Elections in South Dakota
- Political party strength in South Dakota

=== Branches of the government of South Dakota ===
Government of South Dakota

==== Executive branch of the government of South Dakota ====
- Governor of South Dakota
  - Lieutenant Governor of South Dakota
  - Secretary of State of South Dakota
- State departments
  - South Dakota Department of Corrections
  - South Dakota Department of Education
  - South Dakota Department of Transportation

==== Legislative branch of the government of South Dakota ====
- South Dakota State Legislature (bicameral)
  - Upper house: South Dakota Senate
  - Lower house: South Dakota House of Representatives

==== Judicial branch of the government of South Dakota ====
- Federal courthouses in South Dakota
- Courts of South Dakota
  - Supreme Court of South Dakota
    - South Dakota Circuit Courts

=== Law and order in South Dakota ===
Law of South Dakota

- Cannabis in South Dakota
- Capital punishment in South Dakota
  - Individuals executed in South Dakota
- Constitution of South Dakota
- Crime in South Dakota
- Gun laws in South Dakota
- Law enforcement in South Dakota
  - Law enforcement agencies in South Dakota
    - South Dakota Highway Patrol

=== Military in South Dakota ===
- South Dakota Air National Guard
- South Dakota Army National Guard

== History of South Dakota ==
History of South Dakota

=== History of South Dakota, by period ===
Timeline of South Dakota

- Prehistory of South Dakota
- Indigenous peoples
- English territory of Rupert's Land, 1670–1707
- French colony of Louisiane, 1699–1764
  - Treaty of Fontainebleau of 1762
- British territory of Rupert's Land, (1707–1818)-1870
- Spanish (though predominantly Francophone) district of Alta Luisiana, 1764–1803
  - Third Treaty of San Ildefonso of 1800
- French district of Haute-Louisiane, 1803
  - Louisiana Purchase of 1803
- Unorganized U.S. territory created by the Louisiana Purchase, 1803–1804
  - Lewis and Clark Expedition, 1804–1806
- District of Louisiana, 1804–1805
- Territory of Louisiana, 1805–1812
- Territory of Missouri, 1812–1821
  - Anglo-American Convention of 1818
- Unorganized Territory, 1821–1854
  - Mexican–American War, April 25, 1846 – February 2, 1848
  - Treaty of Fort Laramie of 1851
- Territory of Michigan east of Missouri River, 1805–(1834–1836)–1837
- Territory of Wisconsin east of Missouri River, (1836–1838)–1848
- Territory of Iowa east of Missouri River, 1838–1846
- Territory of Minnesota east of Missouri River, 1849–1858
- Territory of Nebraska west of Missouri River, (1854–1861)–1867
- Territory of Dakota, 1861–1889
  - American Civil War, April 12, 1861 – May 13, 1865
    - Dakota in the American Civil War
  - Red Cloud's War, 1866–1868
    - Treaty of Fort Laramie of 1868
  - Black Hills War, 1876–1877
- State of South Dakota becomes 40th State admitted to the United States of America on November 2, 1889
  - Pine Ridge Campaign, 1890–1891
    - Wounded Knee Massacre, 1890
  - Spanish–American War, April 25 – August 12, 1898
  - Wind Cave National Park established on January 9, 1903
  - Wounded Knee Incident, February 27 – May 8, 1973
  - Badlands National Park established on November 10, 1978

=== History of South Dakota, by region ===
==== Municipalities ====
- History of Beresford, South Dakota
- History of Brookings, South Dakota
- History of Rapid City, South Dakota
- History of Sioux Falls, South Dakota
- History of Yankton, South Dakota

=== History of South Dakota, by subject ===
- South Dakota territorial evolution

== Culture of South Dakota ==
Culture of South Dakota

- Gambling in South Dakota
  - Casinos in South Dakota
  - South Dakota Lottery
- Libraries in South Dakota
  - List of Carnegie libraries in South Dakota
- Museums in South Dakota
- Religion in South Dakota
  - Episcopal Diocese of South Dakota
- Scouting in South Dakota
- State symbols of South Dakota
  - Flag of the State of South Dakota
  - Great Seal of the State of South Dakota

=== The Arts in South Dakota ===
- Music of South Dakota

=== Sports in South Dakota ===
Sports in South Dakota

== Economy and infrastructure of South Dakota ==
Economy of South Dakota

- Communications in South Dakota
  - Newspapers in South Dakota
  - Radio stations in South Dakota
  - Television stations in South Dakota
- Energy in South Dakota
  - Power stations in South Dakota
  - Solar power in South Dakota
  - Wind power in South Dakota
- Health care in South Dakota
  - Hospitals in South Dakota
- Transportation in South Dakota
  - Airports in South Dakota
  - Rail transport in South Dakota
    - Railroads in South Dakota
  - Roads in South Dakota
    - Numbered highways in South Dakota
  - Vehicle registration plates of South Dakota

== Education in South Dakota ==
Education in South Dakota

- Schools in South Dakota
  - School districts in South Dakota
    - High schools in South Dakota
  - Colleges and universities in South Dakota
    - College athletic programs in South Dakota
    - Specific colleges and universities
      - University of South Dakota
      - South Dakota State University

== See also ==
- Topic overview:
  - South Dakota
  - Index of South Dakota-related articles
