= Index of South Dakota–related articles =

The location of the state of South Dakota in the United States of America

The following is an alphabetical list of articles related to the U.S. state of South Dakota.

== 0–9 ==
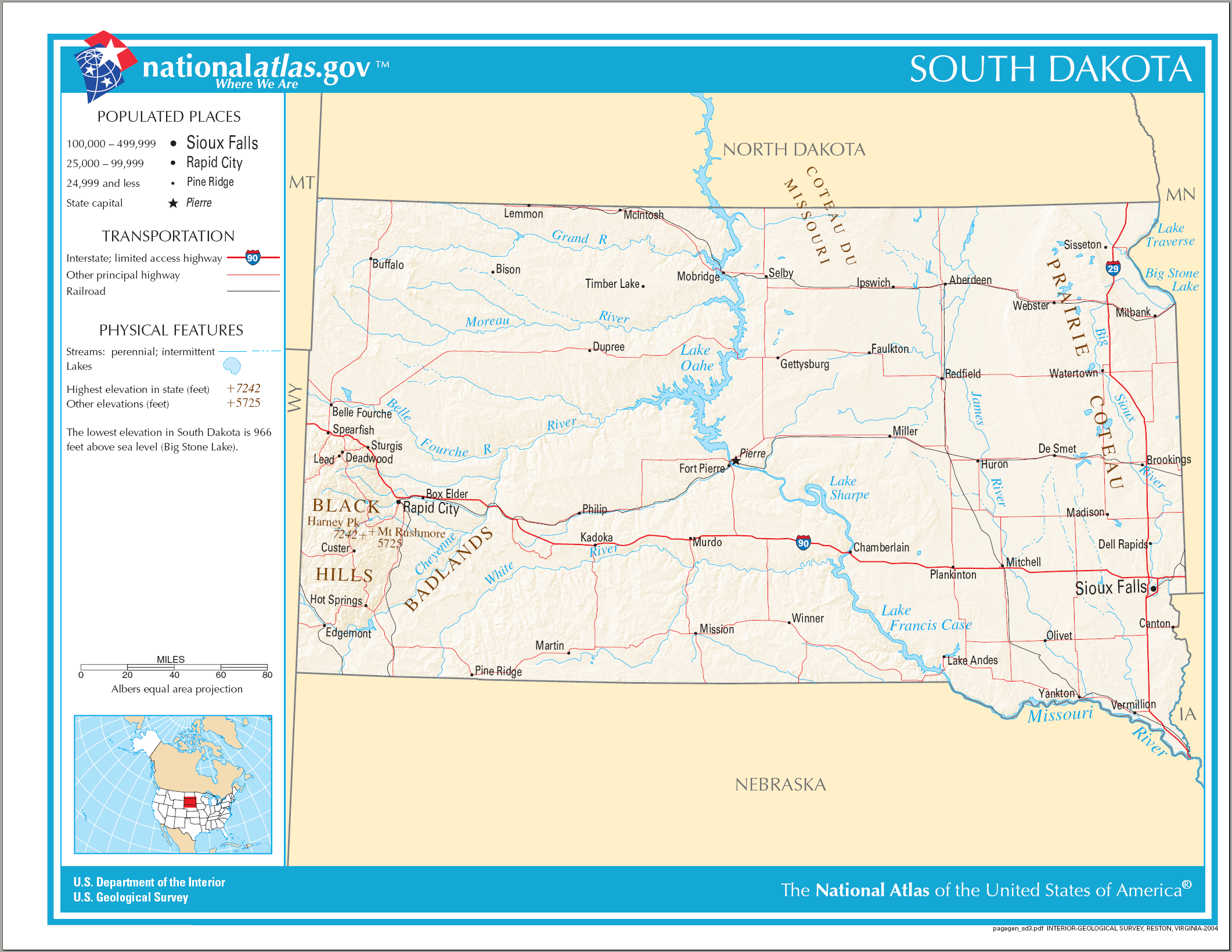
An enlargeable map of the state of South Dakota

- .sd.us – Internet second-level domain for the state of South Dakota
- 40th state to join the United States of America

== A ==
- Abortion in South Dakota
- Adjacent states:
  - State of Iowa
  - State of Minnesota
  - State of Montana
  - State of Nebraska
  - State of North Dakota
  - State of Wyoming
- Agriculture in South Dakota
- Airports in South Dakota
- Amusement parks in South Dakota
- Arboreta in South Dakota
  - commons:Category:Arboreta in South Dakota
- Archaeology in South Dakota
  - Category:Archaeological sites in South Dakota
    - commons:Category:Archaeological sites in South Dakota
- Architecture in South Dakota
- Area codes in South Dakota
- Art museums and galleries in South Dakota
  - commons:Category:Art museums and galleries in South Dakota
- Astronomical observatories in South Dakota
  - commons:Category:Astronomical observatories in South Dakota

== B ==
- Badlands National Park
- Black Hills
- Botanical gardens in South Dakota
  - commons:Category:Botanical gardens in South Dakota
- Buildings and structures in South Dakota
  - commons:Category:Buildings and structures in South Dakota

== C ==
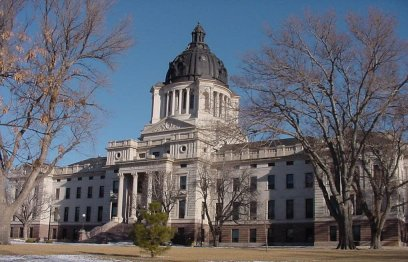
The South Dakota State Capitol in Pierre

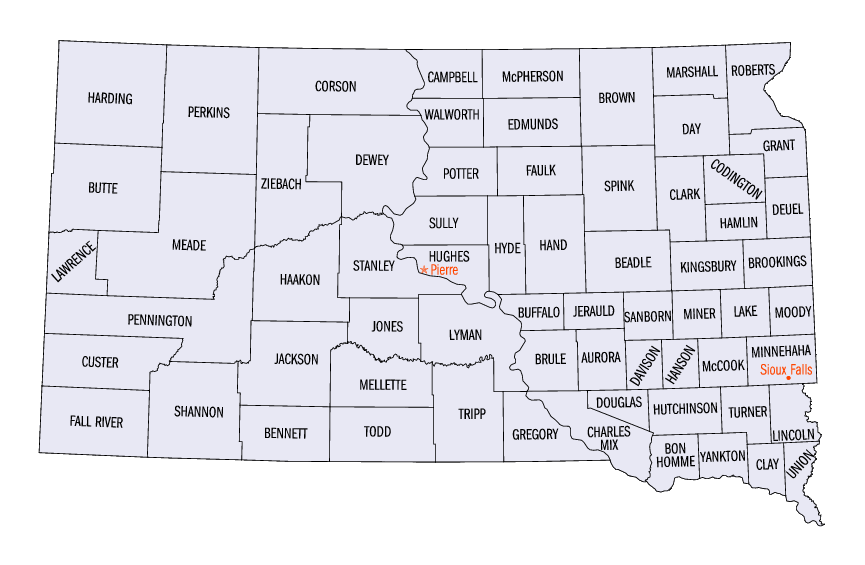
An enlargeable map of the 66 counties of the State of South Dakota

- Capital of the State of South Dakota
- Capitol of the State of South Dakota
  - commons:Category:South Dakota State Capitol
- Casinos in South Dakota
- Caves of South Dakota
  - commons:Category:Caves of South Dakota
- Census statistical areas of South Dakota
- Cities in South Dakota
  - commons:Category:Cities in South Dakota
- Climate of South Dakota
- Colleges and universities in South Dakota
  - commons:Category:Universities and colleges in South Dakota
- Communications in South Dakota
  - commons:Category:Communications in South Dakota
- Companies in South Dakota
- Congressional districts of South Dakota
- Corn Palace
- Coteau des Prairies
- Counties of the State of South Dakota
  - commons:Category:Counties in South Dakota
- Culture of South Dakota
  - commons:Category:South Dakota culture
- Crime in South Dakota

== D ==
- Demographics of South Dakota
  - Category:Demographics of South Dakota
- Dignity (statue)

== E ==
- Economy of South Dakota
  - Category:Economy of South Dakota
    - commons:Category:Economy of South Dakota
- Education in South Dakota
  - Category:Education in South Dakota
    - commons:Category:Education in South Dakota
- Elections in South Dakota
  - commons:Category:Elections in South Dakota
- Environment of South Dakota
  - commons:Category:Environment of South Dakota

== F ==
The Flag of the State of South Dakota

- Festivals in South Dakota
  - commons:Category:Festivals in South Dakota
- Flag of the State of South Dakota
- Forts in South Dakota
  - Category:Forts in South Dakota
    - commons:Category:Forts in South Dakota

== G ==
The Great Seal of the State of South Dakota

- Geography of South Dakota
  - Category:Geography of South Dakota
    - commons:Category:Geography of South Dakota
- Geology of South Dakota
  - commons:Category:Geology of South Dakota
- Ghost towns in South Dakota
  - Category:Ghost towns in South Dakota
    - commons:Category:Ghost towns in South Dakota
- Government of the State of South Dakota website
  - Category:Government of South Dakota
    - commons:Category:Government of South Dakota
- Governor of the State of South Dakota
  - List of governors of South Dakota
- Great Seal of the State of South Dakota

== H ==
- Heritage railroads in South Dakota
  - commons:Category:Heritage railroads in South Dakota
- High schools of South Dakota
- Higher education in South Dakota
- Highway routes in South Dakota
- Hiking trails in South Dakota
  - commons:Category:Hiking trails in South Dakota
- History of South Dakota
  - Historical outline of South Dakota
- Hospitals in South Dakota
- Hot springs of South Dakota
  - commons:Category:Hot springs of South Dakota
- House of Representatives of the State of South Dakota

== I ==
- Images of South Dakota
  - commons:Category:South Dakota

== J ==
- James River
- Jewel Cave (2nd Longest Cave in the World)

== L ==
- Lakes in South Dakota
  - Category:Lakes of South Dakota
    - commons:Category:Lakes of South Dakota
- Landmarks in South Dakota
  - commons:Category:Landmarks in South Dakota
- Lieutenant Governor of the State of South Dakota
- Lists related to the State of South Dakota:
  - List of airports in South Dakota
  - List of census statistical areas in South Dakota
  - List of cities in South Dakota
  - List of colleges and universities in South Dakota
  - List of counties in South Dakota
  - List of dams and reservoirs in South Dakota
  - List of forts in South Dakota
  - List of ghost towns in South Dakota
  - List of governors of South Dakota
  - List of high schools in South Dakota
  - List of highway routes in South Dakota
  - List of hospitals in South Dakota
  - List of individuals executed in South Dakota
  - List of lakes in South Dakota
  - List of law enforcement agencies in South Dakota
  - List of lieutenant governors of South Dakota
  - List of locations in South Dakota by per capita income
  - List of museums in South Dakota
  - List of National Historic Landmarks in South Dakota
  - List of newspapers in South Dakota
  - List of people from South Dakota
  - List of power stations in South Dakota
  - List of radio stations in South Dakota
  - List of railroads in South Dakota
  - List of Registered Historic Places in South Dakota
  - List of rivers of South Dakota
  - List of school districts in South Dakota
  - List of state parks in South Dakota
  - List of state prisons in South Dakota
  - List of symbols of the State of South Dakota
  - List of telephone area codes in South Dakota
  - List of television stations in South Dakota
  - List of South Dakota's congressional delegations
  - List of United States congressional districts in South Dakota
  - List of United States representatives from South Dakota
  - List of United States senators from South Dakota
- Louisiana Purchase

== M ==
- Maps of South Dakota
  - commons:Category:Maps of South Dakota
- Mass media in South Dakota
- Missouri River
- Monuments and memorials in South Dakota
  - commons:Category:Monuments and memorials in South Dakota
- Mount Rushmore National Memorial
- Mountains of South Dakota
  - commons:Category:Mountains of South Dakota
- Mountain ranges of South Dakota
- Museums in South Dakota
  - Category:Museums in South Dakota
    - commons:Category:Museums in South Dakota
- Music of South Dakota
  - commons:Category:Music of South Dakota
  - Category:Musical groups from South Dakota
  - Category:Musicians from South Dakota

== N ==
- National forests of South Dakota
  - commons:Category:National Forests of South Dakota
- Natural gas pipelines in South Dakota
- Natural history of South Dakota
  - commons:Category:Natural history of South Dakota
- Newspapers of South Dakota

== O ==
- Outdoor sculptures in South Dakota
  - commons:Category:Outdoor sculptures in South Dakota

== P ==
- People from South Dakota
  - Category:People from South Dakota
    - commons:Category:People from South Dakota
    - Category:People from South Dakota by populated place
    - Category:People from South Dakota by county
    - Category:People from South Dakota by occupation
- Pierre, South Dakota, state capital since 1889
- Politics of South Dakota
  - commons:Category:Politics of South Dakota
- Portal:South Dakota
- Protected areas of South Dakota
  - commons:Category:Protected areas of South Dakota

== R ==
- Radio stations in South Dakota
- Rapid City, South Dakota
- Railroads in South Dakota
- Registered historic places in South Dakota
  - commons:Category:Registered Historic Places in South Dakota
- Religion in South Dakota
  - Category:Religion in South Dakota
    - commons:Category:Religion in South Dakota
- Renewable energy in South Dakota
- Rivers of South Dakota
  - commons:Category:Rivers of South Dakota
- Rock formations in South Dakota
  - commons:Category:Rock formations in South Dakota

== S ==
- School districts of South Dakota
- Scouting in South Dakota
- SD – United States Postal Service postal code for the State of South Dakota
- Senate of the State of South Dakota
- Settlements in South Dakota
  - Cities in South Dakota
  - Towns in South Dakota
  - Villages in South Dakota
  - Townships in South Dakota
  - Census Designated Places in South Dakota
  - Other unincorporated communities in South Dakota
  - List of ghost towns in South Dakota
- Sioux Falls, South Dakota
- Ski areas and resorts in South Dakota
  - commons:Category:Ski areas and resorts in South Dakota
- Solar power in South Dakota
- South Dakota website
  - Category:South Dakota
    - commons:Category:South Dakota
      - commons:Category:Maps of South Dakota
- South Dakota Highway Patrol
- South Dakota Open and Clean Government Act
- South Dakota Small Investors Protection Act
- South Dakota State Capitol
- Sports in South Dakota
  - commons:Category:Sports in South Dakota
- Sports venues in South Dakota
  - commons:Category:Sports venues in South Dakota
- State of South Dakota website
  - Government of the State of South Dakota
    - Category:Government of South Dakota
      - commons:Category:Government of South Dakota
  - Executive branch of the government of the State of South Dakota
    - Governor of the State of South Dakota
  - Legislative branch of the government of the State of South Dakota
    - Legislature of the State of South Dakota
      - Senate of the State of South Dakota
      - House of Representatives of the State of South Dakota
  - Judicial branch of the government of the State of South Dakota
    - Supreme Court of the State of South Dakota
- State parks of South Dakota
  - commons:Category:State parks of South Dakota
- State police of South Dakota
- State prisons of South Dakota
- Structures in South Dakota
  - commons:Category:Buildings and structures in South Dakota
- Supreme Court of the State of South Dakota
- Symbols of the State of South Dakota
  - Category:Symbols of South Dakota
    - commons:Category:Symbols of South Dakota

== T ==
- Telecommunications in South Dakota
  - commons:Category:Communications in South Dakota
- Telephone area codes in South Dakota
- Television stations in South Dakota
- Territory of Dakota, 1861–1889
- Territory of Iowa, 1838–1846
- Territory of Louisiana, 1805–1812
- Territory of Michigan, 1805-(1834–1836)-1837
- Territory of Minnesota, 1849–1858
- Territory of Missouri, 1812–1821
- Territory of Nebraska, (1854–1861)-1867
- Territory of Wisconsin, 1836-(1838)-1848
- Tourism in South Dakota website
  - commons:Category:Tourism in South Dakota
- Transportation in South Dakota
  - Category:Transportation in South Dakota
    - commons:Category:Transport in South Dakota

== U ==
- United States of America
  - States of the United States of America
  - United States census statistical areas of South Dakota
  - South Dakota's congressional delegations
  - United States congressional districts in South Dakota
  - United States Court of Appeals for the Eighth Circuit
  - United States District Court for the District of South Dakota
  - United States representatives from South Dakota
  - United States senators from South Dakota
- Universities and colleges in South Dakota
  - commons:Category:Universities and colleges in South Dakota
- US-SD – ISO 3166-2:US region code for the State of South Dakota

== W ==
- Wagnus massacre
- Wall Drug Store
- Wind Cave (4th Longest Cave in the World)
- Wind power in South Dakota

== Y ==
- Yankton, Dakota Territory, territorial capital 1861–1883

== See also ==
- Topic overview:
  - South Dakota
  - Outline of South Dakota
