= List of South Dakota state symbols =

Location of the state of South Dakota in the United States of America

This is a list of the official state symbols of the U.S. state of South Dakota.

== Insignia ==
Type	Symbol	Year	Image
Flag	Flag of the State of South Dakota	1992	South Dakota flag
Seal	Great Seal of the State of South Dakota	1885	South Dakota State Seal
Motto	Under God, the people rule		
Nickname	The Mount Rushmore State		
Slogan	Great Faces. Great Places.	1990	

== Species ==
Type	Symbol	Year	Image
Bird	Ring-necked pheasant Phasianus colchicus	1943	
Flower	American pasque flower Pulsatilla vulgaris	1903	
Tree	Black Hills spruce Picea glauca var. densata	1947	
Animal	Coyote; Canis latrans	1949	
Fish	Walleye; Sander vitreus vitreus	1982	
Insect	Western honey bee Apis mellifera	1978	
Grass	Western wheat grass	1970	
Fossil	Triceratops	1988	

== Geology ==
Type	Symbol	Year	Image
Mineral:	Rose quartz	1966	
Gemstone	Fairburn agate	1966	
Soil	Houdek loam	1990	

== Culture ==
Type	Symbol	Year	Image
Drink	Milk	1986	
Sport	Rodeo	2003	
Dessert	Kuchen	2000	
Song	"Hail, South Dakota!"	1943	
Bread	Fry bread	2005	
Jewelry	Black Hills gold	1988	

== See also ==
- Outline of South Dakota
- Index of South Dakota-related articles
- Lists of United States state insignia
- State of South Dakota
