= Black Hills gold jewelry =

Jewelry manufactured in South Dakota, USA

Black Hills gold jewelry is a type of jewelry manufactured in the Black Hills of South Dakota. It was first created in the 1870s during the Black Hills Gold Rush by a French goldsmith named Henri LeBeau, who is said to have dreamed about the design after passing out from thirst and starvation. Black Hills gold jewelry depicts leaves, grape clusters and vines, and is made with alloys of gold with standard yellow gold as well as green and pink gold. In 1980, the 8th Circuit affirmed an injunction ruling that if a manufacturer was to call its jewelry Black Hills Gold, then it must be made in the Black Hills. The state of South Dakota designated Black Hills gold as the official state jewelry in 1988.

The designs use grapes, grape leaves and grape stems and are easily recognizable for their distinctive colors. Silver is alloyed with the yellow gold to produce the green hue, and copper is alloyed with the yellow gold to make the red or pink gold. The jewelry was originally made with South Dakota-mined gold but in more recent years, since the closure of the Homestake Mine, the gold is sourced elsewhere.

== Production ==
Pure 24 Karat gold bars, and stocks of pure silver and copper are the basic materials. These metals are not required to be mined in the Black Hills. The finished jewelry known as Black Hills Gold must be produced in the Black Hills of South Dakota.

The different colors of gold used for leaves and other details are made when the pure 24 Karat yellow gold is alloyed with copper to achieve the traditional 14 karat pink (or red) gold, and the gold is combined with silver to create the 14 karat green gold. The resulting gold bars are then readied for rolling.

The alloyed gold bars are rolled by presses to different thicknesses for different types of jewelry. Each part is individually stamped out of the rolled gold sheets using patterns and dies. The solid gold leaves and other patterns are then added to a cast jewelry base.

The cast pieces are then polished by one of two methods, either traditional hand polishing using a wheel, or a process called "tumbling." For tumbling: many castings at one time are placed in a tub or cylinder with different sizes and shapes of metal, rubber or other materials in a liquid solution, then agitated or rotated until they have been polished smooth. These smooth, cast pieces are then ready for the stamped components, like leaves and grapes, to be mounted on them.

Some manufacturers, such as Landstroms, use the traditional method to attach the pieces, where the stamped components are individually hand-soldered to the cast gold frame using torches and karat-gold solder. Other factories place the solder and components together on the cast item, leaving several such assemblies in a soldering oven where they are soldered by the heat of the oven.

The almost-finished jewelry is cleaned in a mild acid bath, then inspected for quality. A finishing technique known as "wriggling" textures the leaves, creating a textured or frosty effect. Each leaf vein is then hand-engraved.

Each piece is polished in several stages to bring out it's luster. If the item includes gemstones, it is sent to the stone-setting department for mounting before final inspection.
