= Western Dakota Technical College =

Community college in Rapid City, South Dakota, U.S.

Coordinates: 44°04′36″N 103°10′46″W

Western Dakota Technical Institute
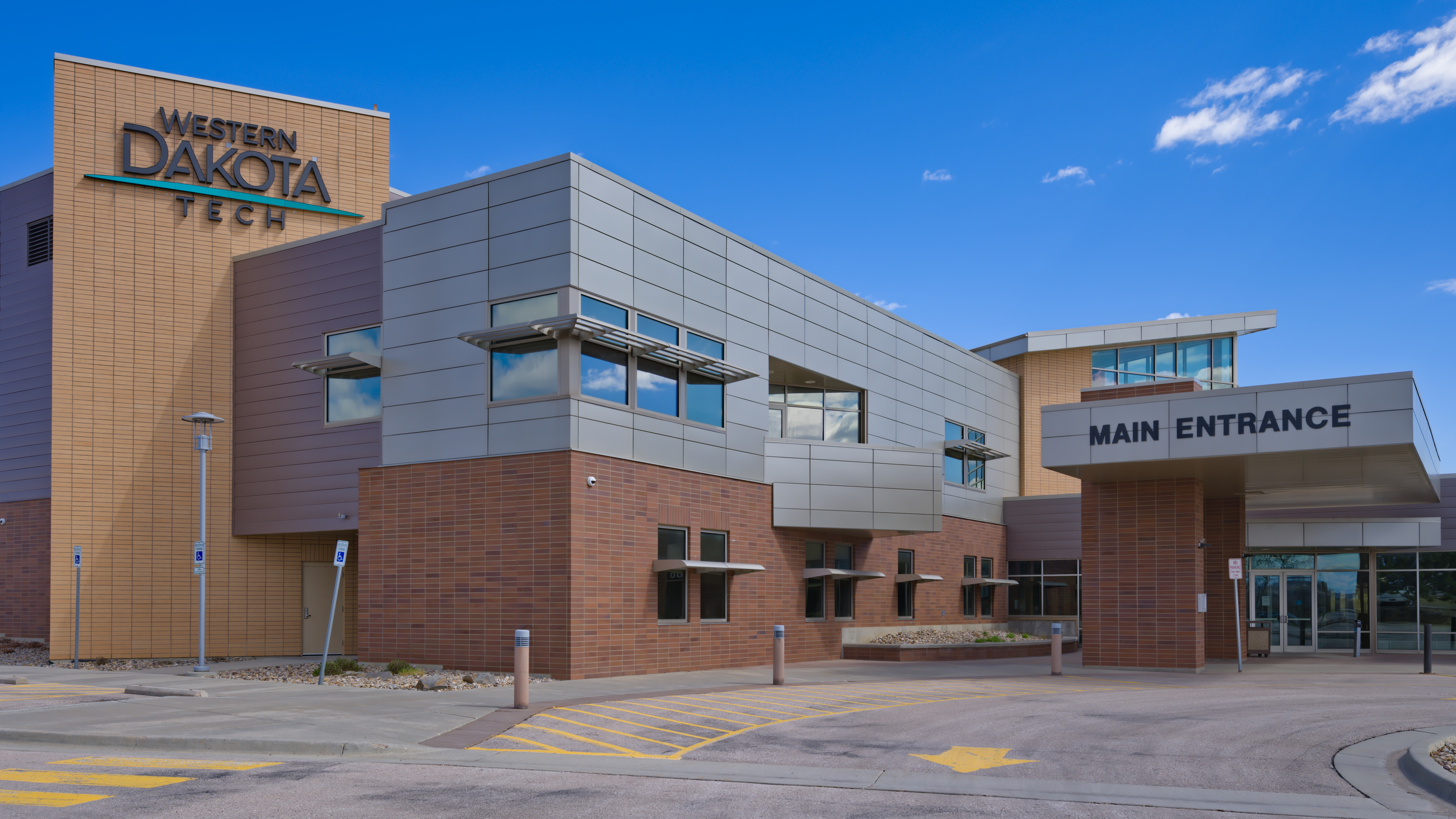
- Type: Public community college
- Established: 1968; 58 years ago
- Accreditation: HLC
- Students: 1,324
- Location: Rapid City, South Dakota, United States
- associate degree programs: 26
- Website: www.wdt.edu
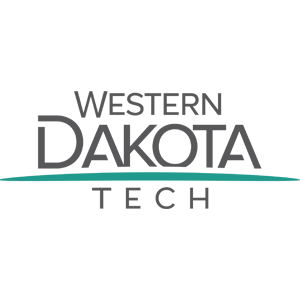

Western Dakota Technical Institute is a public community college in Rapid City, South Dakota. It has an enrollment of 1,324 and offers 26 associate degree programs.

== See also ==
- List of community colleges in the United States
- Education in South Dakota
- List of colleges and universities in South Dakota
