= Avera Health =

Regional U.S. healthcare system serving several Midwestern states

- Type: Private
- Industry: Healthcare
- Founded: 1897; 129 years ago
- Headquarters: Sioux Falls, South Dakota, United States
- Key people: Jim Dover (FACHE, president & CEO)
- Website: www.avera.org

Avera Health is a regional health system based in Sioux Falls, South Dakota, United States, comprising more than 300 locations in 100 communities throughout South Dakota, Minnesota, Iowa, Nebraska and North Dakota. Avera serves a geographical footprint of more than 72,000 square miles and 86 counties, and a population of nearly 1 million.

As a fully integrated health system, Avera Health includes Avera Medical Group, which is composed of physicians and advanced practice providers who serve patients at nearly 200 secure locations across the five-state region.

Throughout the region, Avera Health offers care in 60 distinct specialties, including behavioral health, cardiology, oncology, orthopedics, brain and spine, neurosurgery, digestive disease, bariatrics, dermatology, endocrinology and diabetes, ophthalmology, pulmonology and sleep medicine, pain management, neonatology, pediatrics, rheumatology, women’s specialties and more.

In addition to care, Avera Health Plans was created in 1999 to offer affordable health insurance and a large network of providers. Today, Avera Health Plans serves individuals, families, and employer groups in South Dakota and Iowa and is the third largest health plan in the state of South Dakota.

With more than 16,000 employees and physicians, Avera is South Dakota’s largest private employer. The name Avera is derived from a Latin term meaning “to be well.”

== History ==
Avera came into existence when two orders of religious women—the Benedictine Sisters of Yankton, South Dakota, and the Presentation Sisters of Aberdeen, South Dakota—merged their Catholic health care systems into a single entity.

These two religious orders serve as Avera’s sponsors; that is, their association with Avera gives it the status of officially being a work of the Catholic Church.

- Over the years, the sisters have served in many roles, from governance and administration, to nursing, lab and dietary.
- Their focus is on meeting the health care needs of the communities they serve.

== Services ==
=== Avera eCARE ===
Avera has provided virtual care that dates back to 1993. eCARE uses interactive video and technology to connect with outlying sites through a virtual hospital based in Sioux Falls. eCARE partners with hospitals to provide increased access to specialists through:

- eICU CARE
- eEmergency
- eConsult
- ePharmacy
- eLongTermCare
- eCorrectional Health

Avera eCARE was sold to Aquiline Capital Partners in the fourth quarter of 2021 and rebranded as Avel eCare.

=== Avera Careflight ===
Avera health has operated an air ambulance since May 1986.

=== Research, genomics and genetics ===
Avera’s genomics team involves multiple professionals locally and internationally. Working primarily with breast and gynecologic cancer patients, this team uses genetic analysis to recommend therapies targeted to fight an individual tumor. The Avera Institute for Human Genetics offers personalized medicine for pain management, behavioral health and more, plus DNA analysis as part of the world’s largest twin study, the Netherlands Twins Register (NTR). The Avera Research Institute is conducts clinical trials, cancer registries for breast and thyroid tumors, oncology research nurses, and investigator initiated studies.

Since 2011, Avera has been part of an international trial based in Salzburg, Austria, testing a protocol for women age 41 and over with early stage breast cancer that delivers electron-based intraoperative radiation therapy (IORT) at the time of lumpectomy followed by three weeks of external beam radiation therapy, shortening follow-up external beam radiation therapy by three weeks. A new protocol is testing one-time IORT treatment for patients age 60 and over, eliminating the need for additional radiation.

=== Solid organ and bone marrow transplant ===
Avera is home to the region’s longest standing kidney transplant program, established in 1993, in addition to pancreas and liver transplant. In 1996, Avera began the region’s only Bone Marrow Transplant program, providing both allogeneic and autologous stem cell transplantation.

=== Clinics and centers ===
Through its 300 locations, Avera contains various facilities:

- Primary care clinics and rural clinics
- Specialty clinics
- Tertiary care center
- Community hospitals
- Critical access hospitals
- Specialty heart hospital
- Long-term care and retirement communities
- Behavioral health outpatient and inpatient care for seniors, adults, adolescents and children
- Free-standing outpatient surgery center
- Patient-centered cancer centers
- Sports training and fitness facilities
- Home care and hospice
- Home medical equipment

== Locations ==
The Avera Central Office is based in Sioux Falls, S.D., with six regional centers:

- Avera St. Luke’s Hospital, Aberdeen, South Dakota
- Avera Marshall Regional Medical Center, Marshall, Minnesota
- Avera Queen of Peace Hospital, Mitchell, South Dakota
- Avera St. Mary’s Hospital, Pierre, South Dakota.
- Avera McKennan Hospital & University Health Center, Sioux Falls, South Dakota
- Avera Sacred Heart Hospital, Yankton, South Dakota

=== Other Locations ===
- Avera Behavioral Health Center - Sioux Falls, South Dakota
- Avera Flandreau Medical Center - Flandreau, South Dakota
- Avera Gettysburg Hospital - Gettysburg, South Dakota
- Avera Gregory Healthcare Center - Gregory, South Dakota
- Avera Heart Hospital of South Dakota - Sioux Falls, South Dakota
- Avera Holy Family Health - Estherville, Iowa
- Avera Milbank Area Hospital - Milbank, South Dakota
- Avera Neonatology - Sioux Falls, South Dakota
- Avera Regional Perinatal Center - Sioux Falls, South Dakota
- Avera St. Anthony's Hospital - O'Neill, Nebraska
- Avera St. Benedict Health Center - Parkston, South Dakota
- Brookings and Avera Medical Group - Brookings, South Dakota
- Avera Weskota Memorial Medical Center - Wessington Springs, South Dakota
- Dells Area Health Center/Avera Health - Dell Rapids, South Dakota
- Divine Providence Health Center/Avera Health - Ivanhoe, Minnesota
- Eureka Community Health Services/Avera - Eureka, South Dakota
- Floyd Valley Hospital/Avera Health - Le Mars, Iowa
- Hand County Memorial Hospital/Avera - Miller, South Dakota
- Hegg Memorial Health Center/Avera - Rock Valley, Iowa
- Lakes Regional Healthcare - Spirit Lake, Iowa
- Landmann-Jungman Memorial Hospital/Avera - Scotland, South Dakota
- Marshall County Healthcare Center/Avera - Britton, South Dakota
- Osceola Community Hospital - Sibley, Iowa
- Pediatric Critical Care and Hospitalist Service - Sioux Falls, South Dakota
- Pipestone County Medical Center/Avera - Pipestone, Minnesota
- Platte Health Center/Avera - Platte, South Dakota
- Sioux Center Community Hospital & Health Center/Avera - Sioux Center, Iowa
- St. Michael's Hospital and Nursing Home/Avera Health - Tyndall, South Dakota
- Tyler Healthcare Center/Avera - Tyler, Minnesota
