= List of hospitals in South Dakota =

List of hospitals in South Dakota (U.S. state), grouped by city and sorted by name.

== Aberdeen ==
- Avera St. Luke's Hospital
- Dakota Plains Surgical Center
- Sanford Aberdeen Medical Center

== Armour ==
- Douglas County Memorial Hospital

== Bowdle ==
- Bowdle Hospital

== Britton ==
- Marshall County Healthcare Center

== Brookings ==
- Brookings Health System

== Burke ==
- Community Memorial Hospital

== Canton ==
- Canton-Inwood Memorial Hospital

== Chamberlain ==
- Mid Dakota Medical Center

== Clear Lake ==
- Deuel County Memorial Hospital

== Custer ==
- Custer Regional Hospital

== Dakota Dunes ==
- Siouxland Surgery Center

== De Smet ==
- De Smet Memorial Hospital

== Deadwood ==
- Black Hills Medical Center
- Lead-Deadwood Regional Hospital

== Dell Rapids ==
- Avera Dells Area Health Center

== Eagle Butte ==
- U. S. Public Health Service Indian Hospital

== Eureka ==
- Eureka Community Health Services / Avera Health

== Faulkton ==
- Faulkton Area Medical Center

== Flandreau ==
- Flandreau Medical Center / Avera Health

== Fort Meade ==
- Veterans Affairs Black Hills Health Care System

== Freeman ==
- Freeman Regional Health Services

== Gettysburg ==
- Gettysburg Memorial Hospital

== Gregory ==
- Avera Gregory Healthcare Center

== Hot Springs ==
- Fall River Hospital

== Huron ==
- Huron Regional Medical Center

== Madison ==
- Madison Community Hospital

== Martin ==
- Bennett County Hospital and Nursing Home

== Milbank ==
- Milbank Area Hospital / Avera Health

== Miller ==
- Hand County Memorial Hospital / Avera Health

== Mitchell ==
- Avera Queen of Peace Hospital

== Mobridge ==
- Mobridge Regional Hospital

== Parkston ==
- Avera St. Benedict Health Center

== Philip ==
- Hans P. Peterson Memorial Hospital

== Pierre ==
- St. Mary's Healthcare Center

== Pine Ridge ==
- U. S. Public Health Service Indian Hospital

== Platte ==
- Platte Health Center / Avera Health

== Rapid City ==
- Black Hills Surgery Center
- Black Hills Rehabilitation Hospital
- Indian Health Service Hospital
- Regional Health Rapid City Hospital
- Same Day Surgery Center

== Redfield ==
- Community Memorial Hospital

== Rosebud ==
- U. S. Public Health Service Indian Hospital

== Scotland ==
- Landmann-Jungman Memorial Hospital

== Sioux Falls ==
- Avera Heart Hospital of South Dakota - Sioux Falls
- Avera McKennan Hospital & University Health Center - Sioux Falls
- Children's Care Hospital and School
- Royal C. Johnson Veterans Memorial Hospital
- Select Specialty Hospital-Sioux Falls
- Sioux Falls Surgical Center
- Sanford USD Medical Center

== Sisseton ==
- Coteau des Prairies Hospital

== Spearfish ==
- Spearfish Regional Hospital
- Spearfish Surgery Center

== Sturgis ==
- Sturgis Regional Hospital

== Tyndall ==
- St. Michael's Hospital

== Vermillion ==
- Sanford Vermillion Medical Center

== Viborg ==
- Pioneer Memorial Hospital and Health Services

== Wagner ==
- Wagner Community Memorial Hospital - Avera

== Watertown ==
- Prairie Lakes Hospital & Care Center

== Webster ==
- Sanford Webster Medical Center

== Wessington Springs ==
- Avera Weskota Memorial Medical Center

== Winner ==
- Winner Regional Healthcare Center

== Yankton ==
- Avera Sacred Heart Hospital
- Lewis and Clark Specialty Hospital
