= Wagnus massacre =

Indian massacre

The Wagnus Massacre was an incident that occurred on the Deadwood – Bismarck Trail on July 17, 1877.

== Victims ==
Three members of the Wagnus family, consisting of two brothers, accompanied by one of their wives, were killed.

== Incident ==
The party had left, and was headed north towards Bismarck to catch an outgoing wagon train. They were found the next day by the Bismarck Stagecoach, two miles north of Bear Butte, a sacred Plains Indian site located in South Dakota. The three passengers were found scalped and shot. Their oxen were also killed. Bear Butte may have been used as a lookout site by the attackers.

== Historical marker ==
A historical marker was erected in 1954 by 1954 by Meade County at 44° 31.28′ N, 103° 26.822′ W

The inscription reads as follows:

"On this spot, where the eroded ruts of the Bismarck-Deadwood Trail are still plain to see took place on July 17, 1877 the massacre of the Wagnus family by Indians, who from Bear Butte watched with envy the passing of their lands to the whites. Two brothers and the wife of one, were leaving the "land of Gold" homesick and disappointed. Seeking to catch the main outgoing wagon train they were ambushed, slain, scalped and their oxen shot, their effects despoiled."
