= List of places in South Dakota =

This list of current cities, townships, unincorporated communities, counties, and other recognized places in the U.S. state of South Dakota also includes information on the number and names of counties in which the place lies, and its lower and upper zip code bounds, if applicable.

== See also ==
- List of cities in South Dakota
- List of counties in South Dakota
