= List of colleges and universities in South Dakota =

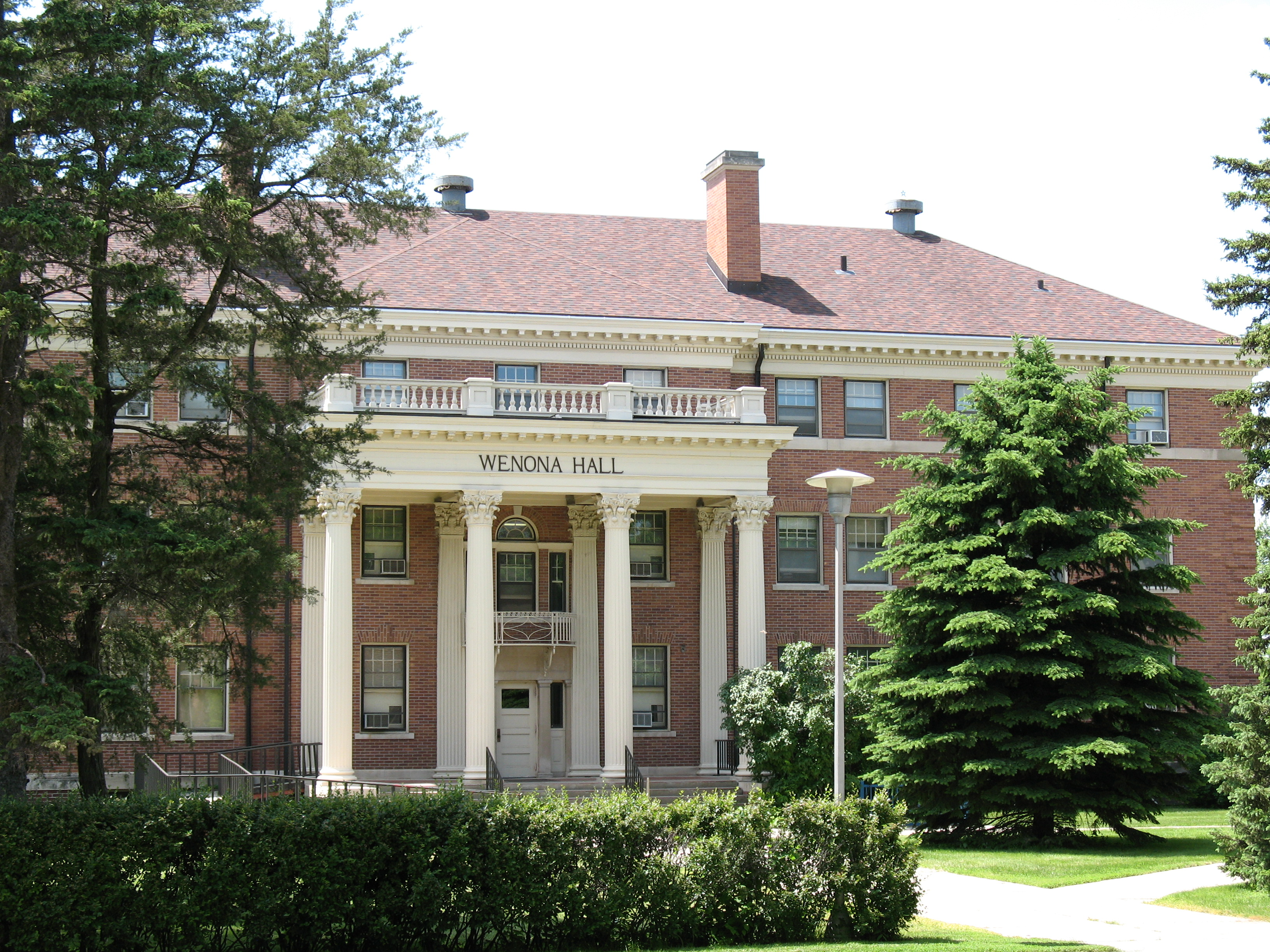
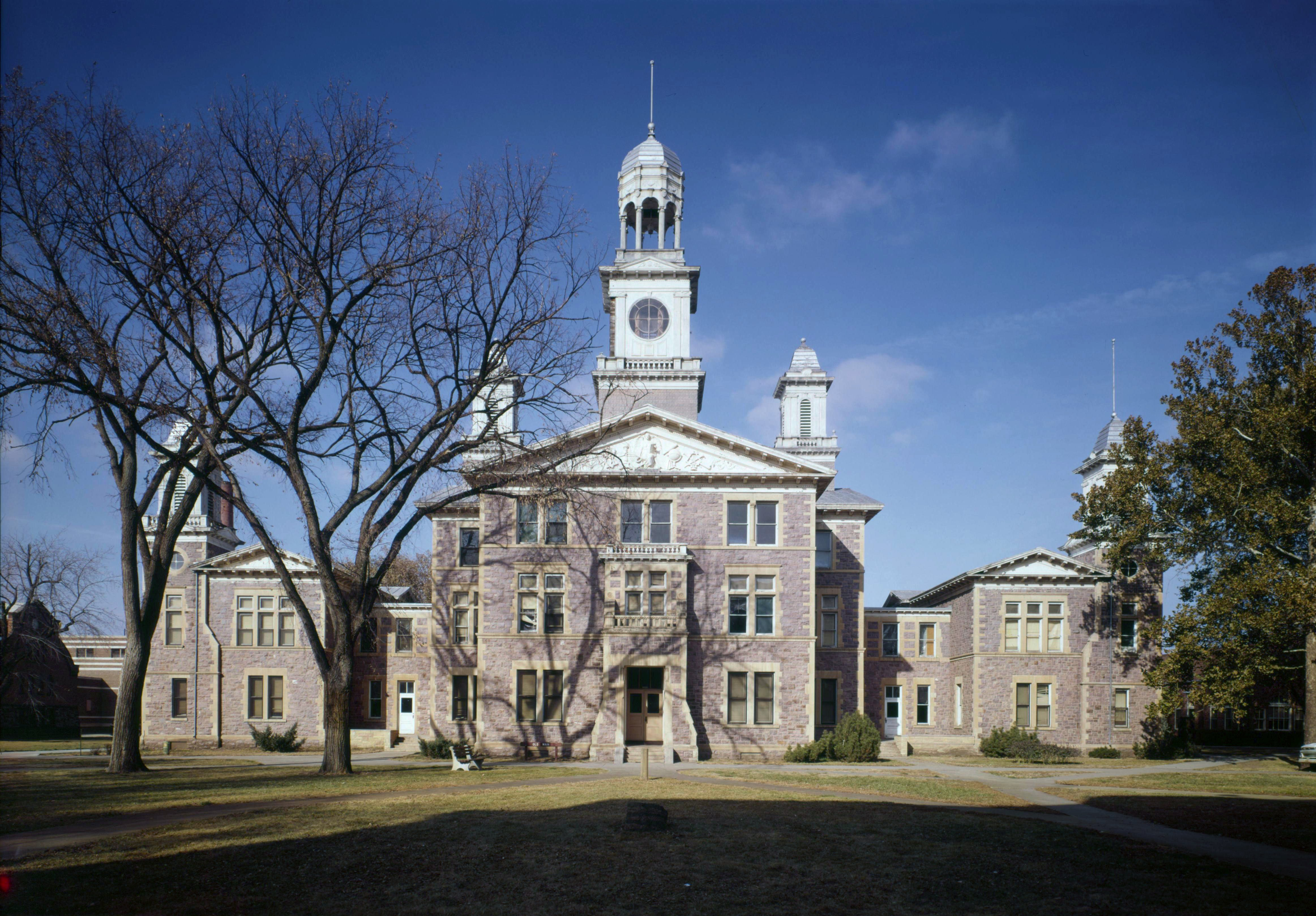
Wenona Hall at South Dakota State University (left) and Old Main at the University of South Dakota (right)

There are twenty-one colleges and universities in the U.S. state of South Dakota that are listed under the Carnegie Classification of Institutions of Higher Education. Brookings-based South Dakota State University (SDSU) is the state's largest public university, with a fall 2024 enrollment of 12,056 students. SDSU is governed by the South Dakota Board of Regents, a governing board that also controls the University of South Dakota (USD), which has the second largest enrollment. In addition, the board controls four other public universities in the state. (Note: Apart from South Dakota State University and the University of South Dakota, the Board governs Black Hills State University, Dakota State University, Northern State University, and South Dakota School of Mines and Technology.) USD is the oldest public university in South Dakota, as it has a founding date of 1862. Augustana University, situated in Sioux Falls, is the largest not-for-profit private university with a fall 2024 enrollment of 2,390 students in attendance.

The state's only law school, the University of South Dakota School of Law, is accredited by the American Bar Association. USD also contains the state's only medical school, the University of South Dakota Sanford School of Medicine. The majority of South Dakota's post-secondary institutions are accredited by the Higher Learning Commission (HLC). Most are accredited by multiple agencies, such as the National Council for Accreditation of Teacher Education (NCATE), the National Association of Schools of Music (NASM), the Commission on Collegiate Nursing Education (CCNE), and the National League for Nursing (NLNAC).

== Extant institutions ==
Institution	Location(s) (Note: School location is based on the Carnegie Classification of Institutions of Higher Education.)	Control (Note: School control is based on the Carnegie Classification of Institutions of Higher Education.)	Type (Note: School types are based on the Carnegie Classification of Institutions of Higher Education.)	Enrollment (Fall 2024)	Founded	Accreditation
Augustana University	Sioux Falls	Private not-for-profit	Master's university	2,390	1860	HLC
Black Hills State University	Spearfish	Public	Master's university	3,346	1883	HLC, NASM, NCATE
Crestmont University	Sioux Falls	Private for-profit	Special-focus institution	623	1996	DEAC, ACBSP
Dakota State University	Madison	Public	Master's university	3,774	1881	HLC, CAEP, CoARC, ACPSP, CAHIIM
Dakota Wesleyan University	Mitchell	Private not-for-profit	Baccalaureate college	892	1885	HLC, NLNAC
Institute of Lutheran Theology	Brookings	Private not-for-profit	Special-focus institution	122	2009	ABHE, ATSCA
Kairos University	Sioux Falls	Private not-for-profit	Special-focus institution	1,239	1858	HLC, ATSCA
Lake Area Technical College	Watertown	Public	Associate's college	2,312	1965	HLC, ADA, AOTA, APTA, NLNAC
Mitchell Technical College	Mitchell	Public	Associate's college	1,186	1968	HLC, JRCERT
Mount Marty University	Yankton	Private not-for-profit	Baccalaureate college	1,284	1936	HLC, CCNE, AANA, NLNAC
National American University	Rapid City	Private for-profit	Special-focus institution	903	1941	HLC
Northern State University	Aberdeen	Public	Baccalaureate college	3,708	1901	HLC, NASM, NCATE
Oglala Lakota College	Kyle	Public	Tribal college	1,188	1971	HLC
Sinte Gleska University	Mission	Public	Tribal college	592	1970	HLC
Sisseton Wahpeton College	Agency Village	Public	Tribal college	206	1979	HLC
South Dakota School of Mines and Technology	Rapid City	Public	Special-focus institution	2,576	1885	HLC
South Dakota State University	Brookings	Public	Research university	12,056	1881	HLC, ACPE, AND, CCNE, NASM, NCATE
Southeast Technical College	Sioux Falls	Public	Associate's college	2,659	1968	HLC
University of Sioux Falls	Sioux Falls	Private not-for-profit	Baccalaureate college	1,450	1883	HLC, CCNE, NCATE
University of South Dakota	Vermillion	Public	Research university	10,619	1862	HLC, ABA, ADA, AOTA, APTA, APA, ASHA, LCME, NASAD, NASM, NAST, NCATE, NLNAC
Western Dakota Technical College	Rapid City	Public	Associate's college	1,164	1968	HLC

== Defunct institutions ==
Institution	Location(s)	Control	Founded	Closed	Ref(s)
Colorado Technical University - Sioux Falls	Sioux Falls	Private for profit	1990	2016	
Columbus College	Chamberlain; Sioux Falls	Private	1909	1929	
Freeman Junior College	Freeman	Private	1903	1986	
Globe University–Sioux Falls	Sioux Falls	Private for-profit	1877	2017	
Huron University	Huron	Private	1897	2001	
John Witherspoon College	Rapid City	Private	2012	2024	
Kilian Community College	Sioux Falls	Private not-for-profit	1977	2016	
National American University–Ellsworth AFB Extension	Ellsworth Air Force Base	Private for-profit	1941	2024 (Note: All NAU campuses closed in 2024 in favor of online courses)	
National American University–Rapid City	Rapid City	Private for-profit	1941	2024 (Note: All NAU campuses closed in 2024 in favor of online courses)	
National American University–Sioux Falls	Sioux Falls	Private for-profit	1941	2024 (Note: All NAU campuses closed in 2024 in favor of online courses)	
Presentation College	Aberdeen	Private not-for-profit	1951	2023	
Redfield College	Redfield	Private	1885	1932 (Note: Merged with Yankton College)	
University of South Dakota – Springfield	Springfield	Public	1881	1984	
Wessington Springs College	Wessington Springs	Private	1887	1964	
Yankton College	Yankton	Private	1871	1984	

== Key ==
Abbreviation	Accrediting agency
AANA	American Association of Nurse Anesthetists
ABA	American Bar Association
ACICS	Accrediting Council for Independent Colleges and Schools
ACPE	Accreditation Council for Pharmacy Education
ADA	American Dental Association
AND	Academy of Nutrition and Dietetics
AOTA	American Occupational Therapy Association
APA	American Psychological Association
APTA	American Physical Therapy Association
ASHA	American Speech–Language–Hearing Association
CCNE	Commission on Collegiate Nursing Education
JRCERT	Joint Review Committee on Education Programs in Radiologic Technology
LCME	Liaison Committee on Medical Education
NASAD	National Association of Schools of Art and Design
NASM	National Association of Schools of Music
NAST	National Association of Schools of Theatre
HLC	Higher Learning Commission
NCATE	National Council for Accreditation of Teacher Education
NLNAC	National League for Nursing
TRACS	Transnational Association of Christian Colleges & Schools

== See also ==
- List of college athletic programs in South Dakota
- Higher education in the United States
- List of American institutions of higher education
