= List of college athletic programs in South Dakota =

This is a list of college athletic programs in the U.S. state of South Dakota.

Notes:

- This list is in a tabular format, with columns arranged in the following order, from left to right:
  - Athletic team description (short school name and nickname), with a link to the school's athletic program article if it exists. When only one nickname is listed, it is used for teams of both sexes. (Note that in recent years, many schools have chosen to use the same nickname for men's and women's teams even when the nickname is distinctly masculine.) When two nicknames are given, the first is used for men's teams and the other is used for women's teams. Different nicknames for a specific sport within a school are noted separately below the table.
  - Full name of school.
  - Location of school.
  - Conference of the school (if conference column is left blank, the school is either independent or the conference is unknown).
- Apart from the ongoing conversions, the following notes apply:
  - Following the normal standard of U.S. sports media, the terms "University" and "College" are ignored in alphabetization, unless necessary to distinguish schools (such as Boston College and Boston University) or are actually used by the media in normally describing the school, such as the College of Charleston.
  - Schools are also alphabetized by the names they are most commonly referred to by sports media, with non-intuitive examples included in parentheses next to the school name. This means, for example, that campuses bearing the name "University of North Carolina" may variously be found at "C" (Charlotte), "N" (North Carolina, referring to the Chapel Hill campus), and "U" (the Asheville, Greensboro, Pembroke, and Wilmington campuses, all normally referred to as UNC-{campus name}).
  - The prefix "St.", as in "Saint", is alphabetized as if it were spelled out.

== NCAA ==
=== Division I ===
Full NCAA Division I member colleges in South Dakota.
- FCS Football

Team	School	City	Conference	Sport sponsorship								
Team	School	City	Conference	Football	Basketball		Baseball	Softball	Ice Hockey		Soccer	
Team	School	City	Conference	Football	M	W	Baseball	Softball	M	W	M	W
South Dakota Coyotes	University of South Dakota	Vermillion	Summit	FCS (Note: South Dakota and South Dakota State's football teams compete in the Missouri Valley Football Conference.)	Yes	Yes	No	Yes	No	No	No	Yes
South Dakota State Jackrabbits	South Dakota State University	Brookings	Summit	FCS	Yes	Yes	Yes	Yes	No	No	No	Yes

=== Division II ===
Full NCAA Division II member colleges in South Dakota.

Team	School	City	Conference	Sport sponsorship								
Team	School	City	Conference	Football	Basketball		Baseball	Softball	Ice hockey		Soccer	
Team	School	City	Conference	Football	M	W	Baseball	Softball	M	W	M	W
Augustana Vikings	Augustana University	Sioux Falls	Northern Sun	Yes	Yes	Yes	Yes	Yes	Yes (Note: Augustana's men's ice hockey team competes in Division I as a member of the Central Collegiate Hockey Association.)	No	No	Yes
Black Hills State Yellow Jackets	Black Hills State University	Spearfish	Rocky Mountain	Yes	Yes	Yes	No	Yes	No	No	No	Yes
Northern State Wolves	Northern State University	Aberdeen	Northern Sun	Yes	Yes	Yes	Yes	Yes	No	No	No	Yes
South Dakota Mines Hardrockers	South Dakota School of Mines & Technology	Rapid City	Rocky Mountain	Yes	Yes	Yes	No	No	No	No	Yes	No
Sioux Falls Cougars	University of Sioux Falls	Sioux Falls	Northern Sun	Yes	Yes	Yes	Yes	Yes	No	No	No	Yes

== NAIA ==
Full NAIA member colleges in South Dakota.
- Football

Team	School	City	Conference	Sport sponsorship						
Team	School	City	Conference	Football	Basketball		Baseball	Softball	Soccer	
Team	School	City	Conference	Football	M	W	Baseball	Softball	M	W
Dakota State Trojans	Dakota State University	Madison	Frontier	Yes	Yes	Yes	Yes	Yes	No	No
Dakota Wesleyan Tigers	Dakota Wesleyan University	Mitchell	Great Plains	Yes	Yes	Yes	Yes	Yes	Yes	Yes
Mount Marty Lancers	Mount Marty University	Yankton	Great Plains	Yes	Yes	Yes	Yes	Yes	Yes	Yes

== See also ==
- List of NCAA Division I institutions
- List of NCAA Division II institutions
- List of NCAA Division III institutions
- List of NAIA institutions
- List of USCAA institutions
- List of NCCAA institutions
