= Music of South Dakota =

The United States state of South Dakota has an official state song, "Hail, South Dakota!", written by DeeCort Hammitt. The state's largest city, Sioux Falls, is home to the South Dakota Symphony Orchestra. The town of Vermillion hosts the National Music Museum.

== Music Venues by City ==
Spearfish The town of Spearfish is home to the High Plains Heritage Center and Museum, which hosts the National Cowboy Song and Poetry Hall of Fame commemorating cowboy performers like Dale Evans, Roy Rogers, Patsy Montana, Jim Bob Tinsley, and Badger Clark. The Matthews Opera House is located downtown.

Rapid City, hosts the Black Hills Symphony Orchestra. The Black Hills Bluegrass Festival is held every year in June and is operated by the Rapid City Arts Council

Custer hosts the Dakota Country Family Music Show and the Mountain Music Show. Brookings

Deadwood hosts the WestFest gathering every year as well.

Sioux Falls hosts the Levitt Pavilion, the Washington Pavilion, Icon Lounge, Total Drag Records, and Trio Jazz Club.

Madison hosts The BrickHouse.

Vermillion hosts the AV Lounge.

Sturgis The Sturgis Motorcycle Rally each summer has had famous bands since 1982, including Jonny Lang from ND.

== Notable South Dakota artists and musicians by city ==
- Shawn Colvin, born in Vermillion, famous for the folk rock song "Sunny Came Home" in 1997.
- Judd Hoos, a rock band from Sturgis.
- Indigenous, a Native American blues rock group that came to prominence in the late 1990s with origins in Marty.
- Clarence Loomis, (1889 – 1965) was an American composer, pianist, and teacher, was born in Sioux Falls.
- Boyd Raeburn, jazz bandleader and bass saxophonist, born in Faith.
- Bob Stewart, jazz tuba player, born in Sioux Falls.
- Floyd Red Crow Westerman, country-western artist, born on the Lake Traverse Indian Reservation.
- The Kickback, an indie rock band formed in Vermillion.
- Paradise Fears, Vermillion.
- Burlap Wolf King, Sioux Falls
- The Spill Canvas, Sioux Falls
- Buddy Red Bow, Pine Ridge
- Jami Lynn, Spearfish
- Rachel Reis, Freeman

== Notable Performances Concerts and Performances ==
- Elvis Presley, Sioux Falls June, 22nd, 1977 and Rapid City June 21st, 1977.

== See also ==
- Indigenous music of North America#Plains
- Sioux music
