= Seal of South Dakota =

Official government emblem of the U.S. state of South Dakota

Great Seal of the State of South Dakota

Versions
- Black and White version
- Armiger: State of South Dakota
- Adopted: 1889
- Motto: Under God the People Rule

The Great Seal of the State of South Dakota was designed while the area was a territory, in 1885. The outer ring of the seal contains the text "State of South Dakota" on the top and "Great Seal" on the bottom. Also, the year of statehood was 1889. Inside the inner circle of the seal contains the state motto "Under God the People Rule," suggested by Sioux Falls newspaperman Samuel Travers Clover. The picture features hills, a river with a boat, a farmer, a mine, and cattle. The items in the image are to represent the state's commerce, agriculture, industry, and natural resources.

Use of the South Dakota state seal is governed under South Dakota state law as follows:

1-6-3.1. Use of seal or facsimile without authorisation prohibited Violation as a misdemeanor. No person may reproduce, duplicate, or otherwise use the official seal of the State of South Dakota, or its facsimile, adopted and described in §§ 1-6-1 and 1-6-2 for any for-profit, commercial purpose without specific authorization from the secretary of state. A violation of this section is a Class 1 misdemeanor.

1-6-3.2. Sale of seal facsimile without authorisation prohibited Violation as misdemean ours. No person may sell or offer for sale a replica or facsimile of the official seal of the State of South Dakota, adopted and described in §§ 1-6-1 and 1-6-2, without specific authorization from the secretary of state. A violation of this section is a Class 1 misdemeanor.

1-6-3.3. Royalty for the use of seal—Educational purposes excepted. The secretary of state shall charge a royalty for the privilege of using the state seal. The secretary of state may not charge a royalty if the state seal is used for an educational purpose. All royalty fees collected according to this chapter shall be deposited in the state general fund.

Many color representations of the South Dakota state seal on the Internet are not an accurate representation of the color seal for South Dakota, as the current representation of the state deal is designated in state law.

1-6-1. State seal adopted Reproductions. There is hereby adopted as the official coloured seal of the State of South Dakota, a reproduction of the seal, described in article XXI, section 1 of the Constitution of the State of South Dakota, and made in conformity in addition to that but whose proportions and coloured detail are set out specifically in accord with an original painting of the great seal produced by John G. Moisan of Fort Pierre and shall be the basis for all reproductions of the great seal of the State of South Dakota. The South Dakota Secretary of State is the designated custodian of the South Dakota State Seal.

== See also ==
- Flag of South Dakota
