= List of South Dakota railroads =

The following railroads operate in the U.S. state of South Dakota.

== Current freight carriers ==
- BNSF Railway Company (BNSF)
- Canadian Pacific Kansas City Limited (CPKC) through subsidiaries Dakota, Minnesota & Eastern Railroad Corporation (DME) and Soo Line Railroad Company (SOO)
- D & I Railroad Co. (DAIR)
- Dakota, Missouri Valley & Western Railroad, Inc. (DMVW)
- Dakota Southern Railway Company (DSRC)
- Ellis & Eastern Company (EE)
- Rapid City, Pierre & Eastern Railroad, Inc. (RCPE)
- Ringneck & Western Railroad, Inc. (RWRR)
- Sisseton Milbank Railroad Company (SMRR) - subsidiary of Twin Cities & Western Railroad Company
- Sunflour Railroad, Inc. (SNR)

== Passenger carriers ==
- Black Hills Central Railroad Co. (DBA "1880 Train")
- Prairie Village, Herman and Milwaukee Railroad

== Defunct railroads ==
| Name | Mark | System (Note: This is one or more of the Class I railroads that the railroad became part of, if any.) | From | To | Successor | Notes |
|---|---|---|---|---|---|---|
| Aberdeen, Fergus Falls and Pierre Railroad | | GN | 1886 | 1886 | St. Paul, Minneapolis and Manitoba Railway | |
| Belle Fourche Valley Railway | | CNW | 1909 | 1920 | Chicago and North Western Railway | |
| Black Hills Railroad | | CB&Q | 1881 | 1882 | Black Hills and Fort Pierre Railroad | |
| Black Hills and Fort Pierre Railroad | | CB&Q | 1882 | 1932 | Chicago, Burlington and Quincy Railroad | |
| Black Hills and Missouri River Railroad | | | 1904 | 1904 | Missouri River and North Western Railway | |
| Buffalo Ridge Railroad | BFRR | | 1988 | 1992 | N/A | |
| Burlington, Cedar Rapids and Northern Railway | BCRN | RI | 1880 | 1903 | Chicago, Rock Island and Pacific Railway | |
| Burlington Northern Inc. | BN | | 1970 | 1981 | Burlington Northern Railroad | |
| Burlington Northern Railroad | BN | | 1981 | 1996 | Burlington Northern and Santa Fe Railway | |
| Cedar Rapids, Iowa Falls and Northwestern Railway | CRIN | RI | 1880 | 1902 | Burlington, Cedar Rapids and Northern Railway | |
| Cherokee and Dakota Railroad | CDRC | IC | 1887 | 1888 | Dubuque and Sioux City Railroad | |
| Chicago, Burlington and Quincy Railroad | CB&Q | CB&Q | 1886 | 1970 | Burlington Northern Inc. | |
| Chicago, Burlington and Quincy Railway | | CB&Q | 1901 | 1907 | N/A | Leased the Chicago, Burlington and Quincy Railroad |
| Chicago, Milwaukee and Puget Sound Railway | | MILW | 1909 | 1912 | Chicago, Milwaukee and St. Paul Railway | |
| Chicago, Milwaukee and St. Paul Railway | CMSP | MILW | 1879 | 1928 | Chicago, Milwaukee, St. Paul and Pacific Railroad | |
| Chicago, Milwaukee and St. Paul Railway of South Dakota | | MILW | 1906 | 1908 | Chicago, Milwaukee and St. Paul Railway of Washington | |
| Chicago, Milwaukee and St. Paul Railway of Washington | | MILW | 1908 | 1909 | Chicago, Milwaukee and Puget Sound Railway | |
| Chicago, Milwaukee, St. Paul and Pacific Railroad | MILW | MILW | 1928 | 1982 | Burlington Northern Railroad, Dakota Rail, Inc., Dakota Southern Railway, D&I Railroad | |
| Chicago and North Western Railway | CNW | CNW | 1879 | 1972 | Chicago and North Western Transportation Company | |
| Chicago and North Western Transportation Company | CNW | CNW | 1972 | 1995 | Union Pacific Railroad | |
| Chicago, Rock Island and Pacific Railroad | RI, ROCK | RI | 1947 | 1972 | N/A | |
| Chicago, Rock Island and Pacific Railway | RI | RI | 1903 | 1948 | Chicago, Rock Island and Pacific Railroad | |
| Chicago, St. Paul, Minneapolis and Omaha Railway | CMO | CNW | 1881 | 1972 | Chicago and North Western Transportation Company | |
| Dakota Central Railway | | CNW | 1879 | 1900 | Winona and St. Peter Railroad | |
| Dakota and Great Southern Railway | | MILW | 1883 | 1886 | Chicago, Milwaukee and St. Paul Railway | |
| Dakota Rail, Inc. | DAKR | | 1982 | 1987 | Sisseton Southern Railway | |
| Dakota Short Line, Inc. | DAKS | | 2001 | 2003 | N/A | |
| Dakota Southern Railroad | | MILW | 1872 | 1879 | Sioux City and Dakota Railroad | |
| Dakota, Wyoming and Missouri River Railroad | | | 1891 | 1903 | Black Hills and Missouri River Railroad | |
| Deadwood Central Railroad | DCRX | CB&Q | 1888 | 1936 | Chicago, Burlington and Quincy Railroad | |
| Dubuque and Sioux City Railroad | DSCR | IC | 1888 | 1946 | Illinois Central Railroad | |
| Duluth, Watertown and Pacific Railway | | GN | 1885 | 1907 | Great Northern Railway | |
| Fairmount and Veblen Railway | | SOO | 1912 | 1915 | Minneapolis, St. Paul and Sault Ste. Marie Railway | |
| Fargo and Southern Railway | FSRC | MILW | 1881 | 1885 | Chicago, Milwaukee and St. Paul Railway | |
| Forest City and Gettysburg Railroad | | | 1900 | 1904 | N/A | |
| Forest City and Sioux City Railroad | | | 1888 | 1896 | Forest City and Gettysburg Railroad | |
| Fremont, Elkhorn and Missouri Valley Railroad | | CNW | 1886 | 1903 | Chicago and North Western Railway | |
| Grand Island and Wyoming Central Railroad | | CB&Q | 1886 | 1897 | Chicago, Burlington and Quincy Railroad | |
| Great Northern Railway | GN | GN | 1890 | 1970 | Burlington Northern Inc. | |
| Illinois Central Railroad | IC | IC | 1887 | 1972 | Illinois Central Gulf Railroad | |
| Illinois Central Gulf Railroad | ICG | | 1972 | 1982 | N/A | |
| James River Valley and North Western Railway | | CNW | 1909 | 1920 | Chicago and North Western Railway | |
| Minnesota Southern Railway | | EE | 2001 | 2017 | Ellis and Eastern Company | |
| Minneapolis and St. Louis Railroad | | MSTL | 1894 | 1944 | Minneapolis and St. Louis Railway | |
| Minneapolis and St. Louis Railway | MSTL | MSTL | 1944 | 1960 | Chicago and North Western Railway | |
| Minneapolis and St. Louis Railway | | MSTL | 1884 | 1894 | Minneapolis and St. Louis Railroad | |
| Minneapolis, St. Paul and Sault Ste. Marie Railroad | SOO | SOO | 1944 | 1961 | Soo Line Railroad | |
| Minneapolis, St. Paul and Sault Ste. Marie Railway | SOO | SOO | 1901 | 1944 | Minneapolis, St. Paul and Sault Ste. Marie Railroad | |
| Minnesota, Dakota and Pacific Railway | | MSTL | 1905 | 1912 | Minneapolis and St. Louis Railroad | |
| Minnesota and South Dakota Railway | | CNW | 1899 | 1900 | Winona and St. Peter Railroad | |
| Missouri River and North Western Railway | | | 1904 | 1909 | Rapid City, Black Hills and Western Railroad | |
| Mound City and Eastern Railway | | | 1927 | 1940 | N/A | |
| Pierre and Fort Pierre Bridge Railway | | CNW | 1905 | 1920 | Chicago and North Western Railway | |
| Pierre, Rapid City and North-Western Railway | | CNW | 1905 | 1920 | Chicago and North Western Railway | |
| Rapid City, Black Hills and Western Railroad | | | 1909 | 1948 | N/A | |
| Rapid City, Missouri River and St. Paul Railroad | | CNW | 1891 | 1905 | Pierre, Rapid City and North-Western Railway | |
| St. Paul and Dakota Railroad | | CNW | 1876 | 1878 | Worthington and Sioux Falls Railroad | |
| St. Paul, Minneapolis and Manitoba Railway | | GN | 1886 | 1907 | Great Northern Railway | |
| St. Paul and Sioux City Railroad | | CNW | 1879 | 1881 | Chicago, St. Paul, Minneapolis and Omaha Railway | |
| Sioux City and Dakota Railroad | | MILW | 1879 | 1881 | Chicago, Milwaukee and St. Paul Railway | |
| Sioux City and Northern Railroad | | GN | 1887 | 1900 | Willmar and Sioux Falls Railway | |
| Sioux City and Pembina Railway | | MILW | 1876 | 1879 | Sioux City and Dakota Railroad | |
| Sioux Falls and Manitoba Railway | | GN | 1902 | 1903 | South Dakota Central Railway | |
| Sioux Falls Terminal Railroad | | GN | 1890 | 1900 | Willmar and Sioux Falls Railway | |
| Sioux Falls, Yankton and South Western Railway | | GN | 1889 | 1893 | Willmar and Sioux Falls Railway | |
| Sisseton Southern Railway | SSOR | | 1987 | 1989 | Sisseton Milbank Railroad | |
| South Dakota Central Railway | | GN | 1903 | 1916 | Watertown and Sioux Falls Railway | |
| South Dakota Western Railway | | CNW | 1890 | 1891 | Fremont, Elkhorn and Missouri Valley Railroad | |
| South Sioux Falls Railroad and Rapid Transit Company | | GN | 1888 | 1890 | Sioux Falls Terminal Railroad | |
| Southern Minnesota Railway | | MILW | 1878 | 1880 | Chicago, Milwaukee and St. Paul Railway | |
| Southern Minnesota Railway Extension Company | | MILW | 1878 | 1880 | Southern Minnesota Railway | |
| Union Pacific Railroad Company | UP | | 1995 | 1996 | Dakota, Minnesota and Eastern Railroad | |
| Watertown and Sioux Falls Railway | | GN | 1916 | 1928 | Great Northern Railway | |
| White River Valley Railway | | MILW | 1905 | 1910 | Chicago, Milwaukee and St. Paul Railway | |
| Willmar and Sioux Falls Railway | | GN | 1886 | 1907 | Great Northern Railway | |
| Winona and St. Peter Railroad | | CNW | 1878 | 1900 | Chicago and North Western Railway | |
| Wisconsin, Minnesota and Pacific Railroad | | MSTL | 1894 | 1899 | Minneapolis and St. Louis Railroad | |
| Wisconsin, Minnesota and Pacific Railway | | MSTL | 1883 | 1894 | Wisconsin, Minnesota and Pacific Railroad | |
| Worthington and Sioux Falls Railroad | | CNW | 1878 | 1879 | St. Paul and Sioux City Railroad | |
| Wyoming and Missouri River Railroad | | | 1895 | 1924 | Wyoming and Missouri River Railway | |
| Wyoming and Missouri River Railway | | | 1924 | 1927 | N/A | |
| Yankton and Western Railway | | CNW/ MILW | 1890 | | | |
