= Ellis and Eastern Company =

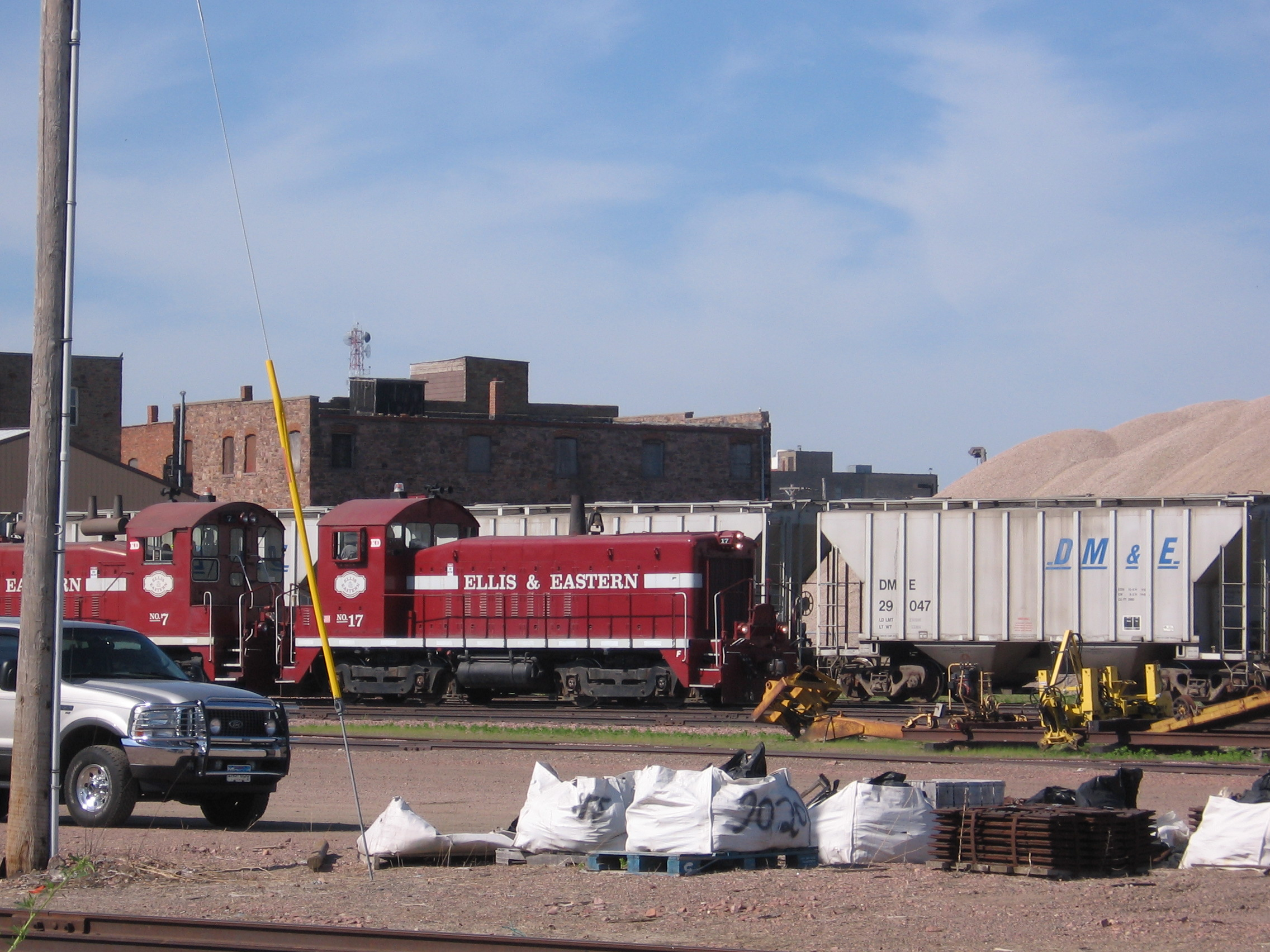
- Ellis & Eastern locomotives in Sioux Falls

Overview
- Parent company: Sweetman Construction Company
- Headquarters: Sioux Falls, South Dakota
- Reporting mark: EE
- Locale: South Dakota, Minnesota
- Dates of operation: 1989–present
- Predecessor: Chicago, St. Paul, Minneapolis and Omaha Railway, Chicago and North Western Railway

Technical
- Track gauge: 4 ft 8 1/2 in (1,435 mm) standard gauge
- Length: 66 miles (106 km)

Other
- Website: https://ellisandeastern.com/

The Ellis and Eastern Company (reporting mark EE) is a shortline railroad operating in eastern South Dakota and southern Minnesota in the United States. The railroad is owned and operated by Sweetman Construction Company of Sioux Falls, South Dakota.

Ellis and Eastern was formed in 1989 using trackage from the former Chicago and North Western Railway to ship Sioux Quartzite, sand, gravel, and other materials from a large quarry in Sioux Falls owned by Sweetman. These materials were hauled to a nearby concrete plant owned by Knife River, which specializes in concrete materials. Today, the railroad is primarily used to transport aggregates for concrete materials. The railroad also partners with area companies by offering rail services to those wanting to decrease trucking costs on cargo such as lumber and scrap metal.

== History ==
The trackage that is now operated by Ellis and Eastern was originally constructed by the Chicago, St. Paul, Minneapolis and Omaha Railway. The original line stretched from Org, Minnesota, to Mitchell, South Dakota. After the Omaha Road merged with Chicago and North Western in 1972, the portion of track between Mitchell and the small community of Ellis, South Dakota, was abandoned by 1980. Sweetman Construction purchased the line east of Ellis in the late 1980s, and it was repaired and reopened in 1989. When it reopened, the line stretched from Ellis to Brandon, South Dakota. As the trackage that was reopened only extended east of Ellis, the railroad became known as Ellis and Eastern.

In 2017, Ellis and Eastern acquired the Minnesota Southern Railway, which ran from Manley, Minnesota to Worthington, Minnesota. The acquisition helped connect Manley to Brandon, SD, and extended the main line to its current length of 66 miles (106 km). This stretch of track had not been in operation since 1994.

In 2020, the railroad was awarded nearly $14.5 million in a Consolidated Rail Infrastructure and Safety Improvements (CRISI) grant from the U.S. Department of Transportation in March 2020. This grant would help the railroad rehabilitate the newly acquired stretch of track from Brandon through Valley Springs, SD, and into Manley, MN.

In 2024, Ellis and Eastern partnered with G.A. Fossum and Associates, Inc., a rail construction company based in Sioux Falls, to start a contracting division. This business expansion allowed the railroad to offer contracting services for railroad construction and maintenance.

In 2025, Ellis and Eastern Rail Services was established in Grand Forks, North Dakota.

== Trackage ==
Ellis and Eastern operates trackage stretching from the small community of Ellis, South Dakota, to Worthington, Minnesota.

Ellis and Eastern owns and operates a stretch of track from Ellis to downtown Sioux Falls. Then, it meets up with BNSF Railway via trackage rights and uses BNSF's Corson Subdivision to run through downtown. Once it gets through downtown Sioux Falls, the Ellis and Eastern then owns and operates the remaining length of trackage stretching to Worthington, MN, where it is able to connect with the Union Pacific Railroad.

== See also ==
- List of South Dakota railroads
- D&I Railroad
