= Minnesota Southern Railway =

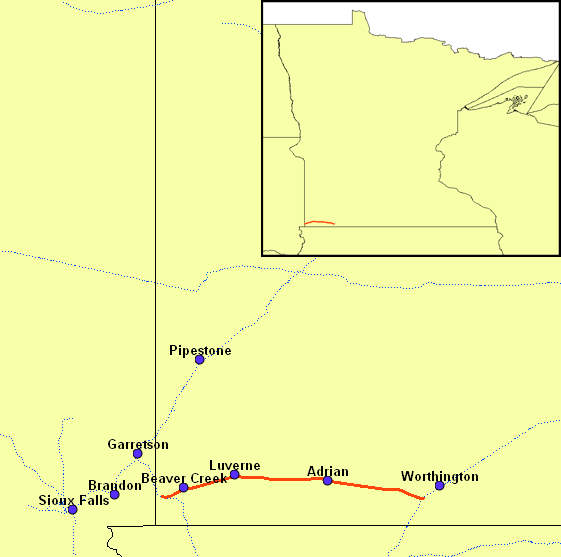

Overview
- Headquarters: Luverne, Minnesota
- Reporting mark: MSWY
- Locale: Minnesota, South Dakota
- Dates of operation: 2001–2017
- Successor: Ellis and Eastern Company

Technical
- Track gauge: 4 ft 8 1/2 in (1,435 mm) standard gauge

The Minnesota Southern Railway (reporting mark MSWY) was a shortline railroad in the states of Minnesota and South Dakota in the United States.

== History as Chicago and North Western Railway ==
The dominant railroad in southern Minnesota was the Chicago and North Western, and by 1875 had all of its mainlines complete in Minnesota. For the next 35 years, it would develop its branch lines, especially in Southwestern Minnesota. Like most other major railroads, the CNW overbuilt; meaning every town in extreme Southwest Minnesota had a railroad by 1900. Many of these branch lines had a temporary boom of business but soon were operating at a loss. The main business was based on agriculture products and the railroads were often a victim of poor crop years, which was often.

The mainline into Worthington runs from St. Paul, Minnesota, to Sioux City, Iowa. It was built by the St. Paul & Sioux City R.R. Being the mainline, it had control of all railroads shipping west into Dakota Territory.

In 1876, the Southern Minnesota Railroad planned to build a Mainline along the Minnesota and Iowa border from Wisconsin to Dakota Territory, running through Worthington, Minnesota and ending in Sioux Falls, South Dakota. The St. Paul & Sioux City Railroad did not want a competing railroad in this area and began surveying and laying rail out of Worthington to the west. Their goal was to reach Luverne, Minnesota in the same year. The name of this line was the Worthington & Sioux Falls RR later changed to the Worthington & Dakota Railroad. The first name was so that the Southern Minnesota Railroad knew exactly where the new line was running to try and discourage them from building their own. The Worthington & Dakota Railroad began laying track in July 1876 and in mid-August had reached Adrian and started running trains immediately.

The first train to Luverne was on October 2, 1876, but since the Little Rock River Bridge was not yet complete, the train had to stop 1/2 mile from town. Passengers had to either walk to town or take the stagecoach. A few weeks later, the bridge was complete and rails were laid into Luverne. The Southern Minnesota Railroad had given up on its plan to build the mainline due to the swift progress of the Worthington & Dakota. The rail from Luverne to Sioux Falls was then completed in the spring of 1878.

The building of the railroad to Luverne brought a flood of immigrants to the area and the railroad had to run extra trains to handle all the passengers. With this increased service to the area, the construction crews returned in 1880 and built a branch line to Doon, Iowa. It was the only railroad in the area until a few years later when the Great Northern Railway built a branch line in the area. The Doon line was abandoned in 1933.

The rail size here was 45 pound; today, it ranges from 80 to 135 pound. In 1901, a turntable was built here for turning locomotives. It was removed in 1964 when the diesels replaced the steam engines.

In 1913, the present passenger depot was built in Luverne along with a freight depot. The freight depot was removed in 1991. About 1986 or 1987, Chicago and North Western (CNW) closed down a rail line that ran from Agate Junction, just west of Worthington, MN, to Sioux Falls, SD.

== After Chicago and North Western Railway ==
About 1988, Larry Wood, of the Minnesota Valley Transportation, Inc. (reporting mark MNVA), bought the line and named it the Buffalo Ridge Railroad (reporting mark BFRR). The BFRR operated until June 1992. The track speed was 10 mph. The line remained closed until July 1993. The railroad operated between Agate Junction, just west of Worthington, MN, to Sioux Falls, SD.

== Buffalo Ridge Rail Authority ==
The Buffalo Ridge Rail Authority bought the line in 1988, and Rail Equipment and Transportation, Inc. (reporting mark RETI), owned by Bill Dahlin and Dirk Lenthe, were contracted to operate on the line after the Buffalo Ridge Railroad ceased operations. This line ran from Agate Junction to Manley Interchange, located 1 mile east of the South Dakota state line. The railroad was named Nobles Rock Railroad (reporting mark NRR) after the two counties that the rail crosses. RETI started a re-habilitation project that lasted two years. The track speed was 10 mph (16 km/h). RETI closed the railroad on March 13, 1998.

NRR trackage rights was quickly bought and was operating under new ownership by April 1, 1998. Tim Tennant, President/CEO of Cascade Railcorp, purchased the lease on the line.

In August 1999, Cascade Railcorp also invested in two other rail lines, the Minnesota Central and the NRR Dakota Division. Both of these railroads were in trouble. The Minnesota Central was based out of Morton, Minnesota and the NRR Dakota Division was based out of White Lake, South Dakota. Both railroads needed a lot of work. By July 2000, the Dakota Division had derailment bills that totaled in excess of $1 million. The Dakota Division had the potential to make money, but the rail needed improvement to make it profitable. Cascade Railcorp called on the State of South Dakota for assistance. The State of South Dakota was uncooperative about granting Cascade Railcorp any money to give the line a much needed rehabilitation. NRR Dakota Division subleased the track from Dakota Southern Railway for the ten months that the NRR Dakota Division operated. As a comparison of cost of operation, Dakota Southern Railway in the twenty-five years it operated before being sold to new owners effective Oct. 1, 2009 never had a derailment that exceeded its $25,000 retained liability.

The debts incurred in the Minnesota Central and Dakota Division were catching up with the Cascade Railcorp. In July 2000, Independent Locomotive Service of Bethel, Minnesota recalled all the locomotives leased by Cascade Railcorp. Cascade Railcorp was more than $100,000 in debt on lease payments. This stopped traffic on all three lines. In August 2000, Cascade Railcorp filed for Chapter 11 bankruptcy.

In 2001, the Buffalo Ridge Rail Authority awarded the operational lease to Minnesota Southern Railway, owned by Brent Polanchek.

In 2017, the Ellis & Eastern Company purchased the Minnesota Southern Railway and its system, thus ending the railroad's operations.
