= Ellis, South Dakota =

Unincorporated community in South Dakota, US

Coordinates: 43°33′45″N 96°49′50″W

Ellis is an unincorporated community in south-central Minnehaha County, South Dakota, United States. Ellis is located approximately one mile west of the Sioux Falls city limits on Ellis Road, or 1.5 miles (2.4 km) north of South Dakota Highway 42. The community is considered a part of the Sioux Falls metropolitan area.

== History ==
Ellis was founded on April 27, 1893, and was originally called Scoopville. The present name most likely honors A. B. Ellis, a railroad employee.

The Ellis & Eastern Company, a railroad formed in 1989 with company headquarters in Sioux Falls, takes its name from the section of track it operates, which starts in Ellis and runs to the east for over 60 miles to Worthington, Minnesota. In 1995, the two largest commodities carried by trains were non-metallic minerals and chemicals, mostly for factories near Sioux Falls.
