= Dakota Rail =

Former railroad in Minnesota and South Dakota

Overview
- Reporting mark: DAKR
- Locale: Minnesota; South Dakota
- Dates of operation: 1982–2001
- Predecessor: Burlington Northern Railroad; Chicago, Milwaukee, St. Paul and Pacific Railroad
- Successor: Sisseton Southern Railway

Technical
- Track gauge: 4 ft 8 1/2 in (1,435 mm)
- Length: 82 miles (132 km)

Dakota Rail, Inc. (reporting mark DAKR) was a short-line railroad which operated in South Dakota and Minnesota. It operated from 1982 until 2001. From 1995 onward, it was a subsidiary of RailAmerica.

== History ==
Dakota Rail was founded in 1982 to operate the Sisseton Branch, a 38-mile (61 km) railway line between Sisseton, South Dakota, and Milbank, South Dakota, owned by the Chicago, Milwaukee, St. Paul and Pacific (Milwaukee Road). The Milwaukee Road was in the throes of its final bankruptcy; barley shippers in the Sisseton area sought to ensure that service would continue. Dakota Rail, together with the Sisseton Line Associations and SLA Property Management, purchased the line for $660,000. Dakota Rail spent more than $3 million rehabilitating the line.

Dakota Rail expanded into neighboring Minnesota in 1985 after the Burlington Northern Railroad announced plans to abandon its Hutchinson Subdivision (more commonly known as the Hutch Spur), a 44-mile (71 km) line that branched off the Wayzata Subdivision in Wayzata and ended in Hutchinson, Minnesota. Local efforts to save the line were led by Ancher Nelsen, a former U.S. Representative. Dakota Rail leased the line from the Burlington for $100/year, with an option to buy for $5 million after five years. Dakota Rail's two lines were not geographically contiguous.

Dakota Rail operation of the Sisseton Branch ended in July 1987, with the Sisseton Southern Railway taking over. The company went bankrupt in 1988 but emerged from bankruptcy in 1990 with new owners. RailAmerica, a short-line railroad holding company, acquired Dakota Rail in 1995 for $1.5 million. RailAmerica abandoned the Hutch Spur in 2001 and sold the right-of-way to the Hennepin County Regional Railroad Authority, Carver County, and McLeod County. The Dakota Rail Regional Trail now runs over part of the former line.
