= Hail, South Dakota! =

State song of South Dakota

- Regional anthem of South Dakota
- Lyrics: DeeCort Hammitt
- Music: DeeCort Hammitt
- Published: 1943

"Hail! South Dakota!" is the regional anthem of South Dakota, selected by popular vote as the official state song. It was written and composed by DeeCort Hammitt (1893-1970).

It was originally published under The Sunshine State Music Co. Alcester, So. Dakota .

== Lyrics ==
Original DeeCourt Hammitt Lyrics

Hail! South Dakota! a great state of the land;
Health, wealth and beauty, that's what makes her grand;
She has her Black Hills, and mines with gold so rare,
And with her scenery, no other state can compare.

Come where the sun shines, and where life's worth your while;
You won't be here long, till you'll wear a smile;
No state's so healthy, and no folk quite so true.
To South Dakota we welcome you.

Hail! South Dakota! the state we love the best,
Land of our fathers, builders of the west;
Home of the Badlands, and Rushmore's ageless shrine,
Black Hills and prairies, farmland and sunshine.
Hills, farms and prairies, blessed with bright sunshine.

== About Writers ==
The song "Hail South Dakota" was originally written by Deecourt Keith "Deckert" Hammitt during WW2 in 1943

Deecourt was Born and raised in Spencer, McCook County, South Dakota on January 6, 1893, and later died on August, 24, 1970 at Sacramento, Sacramento County, California and was buried at Fair Oaks, Sacramento County, California.
