= Belle Fourche Valley Railway =

Former railway in South Dakota

The Belle Fourche Valley Railway was a South Dakotan railway. The Belle Fourche Valley Railway Company was incorporated under South Dakota law on May 26, 1909, and its railway line began operating on July 1, 1910. The line ran from Newell to Belle Fourche for a total of 23.52 miles (37.85 km) and included an additional 2.96 miles (4.76 km) of sidings. The railway was an extension of an existing 88-mile Chicago and North Western Railroad line that ran through Butte and Meade Counties, ending in Belle Fourche. The company itself was leased by the Chicago and North Western Railroad on July 1, 1912. It is now defunct.
