= Forest City and Gettysburg Railroad =

Coordinates: 45°0′56.4″N 99°57′20.6″W

The Forest City and Gettysburg Railroad was a small, short-lived railroad that ran between the South Dakota towns of Forest City and Gettysburg, a distance of 19 miles. The line was constructed in 1890, and in part transported agricultural products to Forest City for transshipment on Missouri River steamboats. Commercial traffic on the river was already in decline by that time, however, and the railroad was not financially successful; it was abandoned in 1911, one of the first rail lines in the state to be discontinued. The line was financially supported in part by the Chicago and North Western Railway, which connected with the line in Gettysburg.

Small segments of the former railroad grade remain visible today. The line's former western terminus at Forest City is now beneath the waters of Lake Oahe.
