= Sisseton Milbank Railroad =

Overview
- Reporting mark: SMRR
- Locale: South Dakota
- Dates of operation: 1987–present
- Predecessor: Chicago, Milwaukee, St. Paul and Pacific Railroad, Dakota Rail

Technical
- Track gauge: 4 ft 8 1/2 in (1,435 mm) standard gauge
- Length: 34 miles (61 km)

The Sisseton Milbank Railroad (reporting mark SMRR) is a railroad subsidiary of the Twin Cities and Western Railroad that operates between its namesake, the cities of Sisseton and Milbank in South Dakota.

The Sisseton Milbank Railroad operates former Dakota Rail trackage, which is a former Chicago, Milwaukee, St. Paul and Pacific Railroad branchline. The railroad mostly ships grain from the elevator in Sisseton to Milbank to be shipped out on the BNSF or Twin Cities and Western Railroad line. They also store rail cars on this line when grain shipments are not needed. Currently the railroad ships about 2,500,000 bushels of grain per year, or a little over 500 carloads annually.

== Rebuilding ==
Work on the rail bridge over Lake Farley, the longest structure on the railroad, received a nearly $1.7 million grant to replace the structure. The work was completed in the fall of 2022.

In the South Dakota state budget proposed by governor Kristi Noem in December 2022, $6,250,000 was proposed as the state's matching contribution to a proposed $24,000,000 Federal Government grant to rebuild the railroad, upgrading from lightweight 75 lb rail rolled as far back as 1884, capable of train speeds of only 3 to 5 miles per hour, with a weight limit of 263,000 lbs, and a limit of 13 loaded rail cars.

In October 2024 a federal grant was awarded for just over $4,000,000 to replace, install, refurbish, lengthen, and realign culverts along the main line, improve drainage and increase track stability. The SMRR was to provide a 20 percent match. In late October of 2026, however, the SMRR announced it had abandoned its rehabilitation plans and was instead going to ask regulators for permission to cease operations. The reasons cited were a drop in traffic, significant flood damage suffered in July, 2026, which embargoed the line, and a bridge which recently failed inspection. But the tracks will be left in place.
