= Beaver Creek Township, Rock County, Minnesota =

Beaver Creek Township, Minnesota
- Township
- Location within the state of Minnesota Beaver Creek Township, Minnesota (the United States)
- Coordinates: 43°38′9″N 96°22′5″W
- Country: United States
- State: Minnesota
- County: Rock

Area
  - Total: 48.2 sq mi (124.9 km^{2})
  - Land: 48.2 sq mi (124.8 km^{2})
  - Water: 0 sq mi (0.0 km^{2})
- Elevation: 1,457 ft (444 m)

Population (2000)
  - Total: 391
  - Density: 8.0/sq mi (3.1/km^{2})
- Time zone: UTC-6 (Central (CST))
  - Summer (DST): UTC-5 (CDT)
- ZIP code: 56116
- Area code: 507
- FIPS code: 27-04510
- GNIS feature ID: 0663542

Beaver Creek Township is a township in Rock County, Minnesota, United States. The population was 391 at the 2000 census.

Beaver Creek Township was organized in 1872, and named after Beaver Creek.

== Geography ==
According to the United States Census Bureau, the township has a total area of 48.2 square miles (125 km^{2}), of which 48.2 square miles (125 km^{2}) is land and 0.02% is water.

== Demographics ==
As of the census of 2000, there were 391 people, 141 households, and 119 families residing in the township. The population density was 8.1 inhabitants per square mile (3.1/km^{2}). There were 145 housing units at an average density of 3.0 per square mile (1.2/km^{2}). The racial makeup of the township was 99.23% White, 0.26% Native American, 0.26% Asian, and 0.26% from two or more races. Hispanic or Latino of any race were 0.26% of the population.

There were 141 households, out of which 39.7% had children under the age of 18 living with them, 75.2% were married couples living together, 5.0% had a female householder with no husband present, and 14.9% were non-families. 13.5% of all households were made up of individuals, and 7.1% had someone living alone who was 65 years of age or older. The average household size was 2.77 and the average family size was 3.03.

In the township the population was spread out, with 28.6% under the age of 18, 8.7% from 18 to 24, 23.0% from 25 to 44, 27.1% from 45 to 64, and 12.5% who were 65 years of age or older. The median age was 39 years. For every 100 females, there were 117.2 males. For every 100 females age 18 and over, there were 114.6 males.

The median income for a household in the township was $43,750, and the median income for a family was $50,625. Males had a median income of $27,500 versus $22,083 for females. The per capita income for the township was $18,384. About 3.6% of families and 6.0% of the population were below the poverty line, including 6.7% of those under age 18 and 14.5% of those age 65 or over.

== Politics ==
Beaver Creek Township is located in Minnesota's 1st congressional district, represented by Mankato educator Tim Walz, a Democrat. At the state level, Beaver Creek Township is located in Senate District 22, represented by Republican Doug Magnus, and in House District 22A, represented by Republican Joe Schomacker.
