= Manley, Minnesota =

Manley
- Unincorporated community
- Location within Minnesota Location within the United States
- Coordinates: 43°35′25″N 96°25′52″W
- Country: United States
- State: Minnesota
- County: Rock County
- Township: Beaver Creek Township
- Elevation: 1,404 ft (428 m)

Population
  - Total: 16
- Time zone: UTC-6 (Central (CST))
  - Summer (DST): UTC-5 (CDT)
- Area code: 507
- GNIS feature ID: 654814

Manley is an unincorporated community in Beaver Creek Township, Rock County, Minnesota, United States.

The community is located one mile south of Interstate 90 on Rock County Road 17, which is an extension of Minnesota State Highway 23, and one mile east of Valley Springs, South Dakota. Nearby places also include Beaver Creek and Hills.

Manley is located within sections 35 and 36 of Beaver Creek Township.

== History ==
The community of Manley was platted in October 1889, and had a post office from 1890 until 1914. Manley was named for W. P. Manley, cashier of the Security National Bank in Sioux City, Iowa, and a stockholder of the Sioux City and Northern Railway. Today, the community is home to a service station and a railroad junction named after the community.
