= D&I Railroad =

Class III shortline railroad in South Dakota

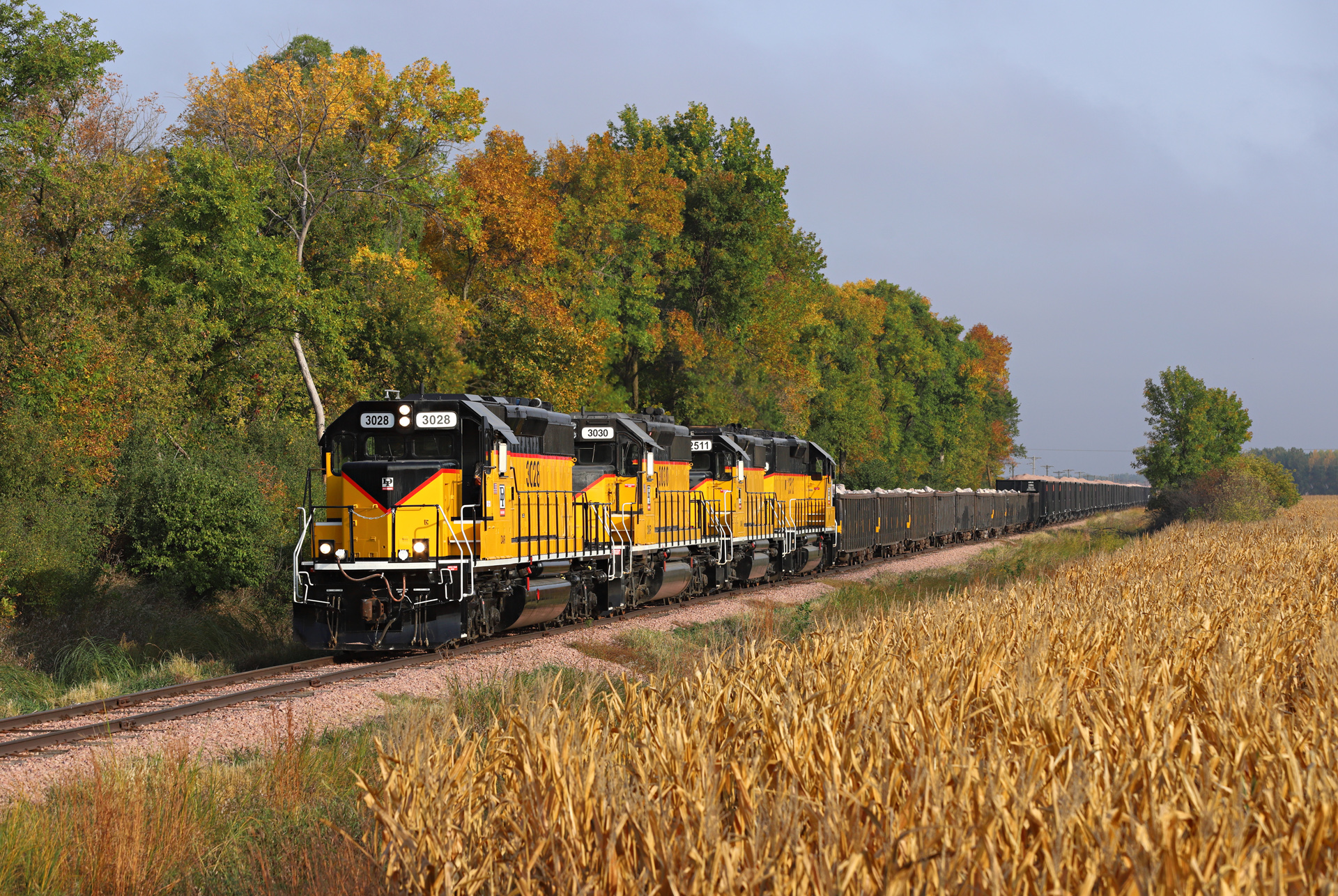

Overview
- Headquarters: Dell Rapids, South Dakota
- Reporting mark: DAIR
- Locale: South Dakota, Iowa
- Dates of operation: 1985–present
- Predecessor: Chicago, Milwaukee, St. Paul and Pacific Railroad, Chicago and North Western Transportation Company

Technical
- Track gauge: 4 ft 8 1/2 in (1,435 mm) standard gauge
- Length: 138 miles (222 km)

Other
- Website: https://dirailroad.com/

The D&I Railroad (reporting mark DAIR) (also known as the Dakota and Iowa Railroad) is a Class III shortline railroad which is a wholly owned subsidiary of L. G. Everist, Inc. The line hauls ethanol, dried distillers grains (DDG), corn oil, plastic pellets, cement, sand, gravel, and Sioux Quartzite, which is mined from two large quarries in Dell Rapids, South Dakota.

The D&I operates on both former Chicago, Milwaukee, St. Paul and Pacific Railroad and Chicago and Northwestern Railroad trackage, which were handed over to the state of South Dakota in 1980-1981 after the Milwaukee Road’s bankruptcy and subsequent abandonment of unprofitable lines.

== Name ==
The railroad is known as the Dakota and Iowa Railroad or D&I. The reporting mark for the road is DAIR. However, the railcars are under private ownership of the parent company, L. G. Everist Inc., operating under reporting mark LGEX.

== Trackage ==
The D&I operates 138 miles of track from Dell Rapids, SD to Sioux City, IA via company-owned trackage and via trackage rights with BNSF Railway.

From Dell Rapids to Sioux Falls, the track is owned and operated by D&I. Between Sioux Falls and Canton, SD the railroad operates via BNSF's Madison and Canton Subdivisions. South of Canton and stretching to Elk Point, SD the railroad operates trackage that is owned by the State of South Dakota. Finally, the D&I connects with BNSF's Aberdeen Subdivision in Elk Point to haul products down to Sioux City, IA, where the railroad can connect with BNSF, Union Pacific, or Canadian National.

Near Hudson, SD is a POET biorefinery that produces ethanol, DDG, and corn oil. The D&I operates a siding servicing the facility that it can use to transport these products down to Sioux City. Most of these products are loaded onto barges alongside the Missouri River (typically at or near Big Soo Terminal),

The D&I also operates a former CNW branch line from Hawarden, IA to Beresford, SD, which is also owned by the State of South Dakota.

== Roster ==
As of August 2021:

- 170 Gondola cars
- 60+ Control Flow Ballast cars
- 390+ Pneumatic Open-Top Hopper cars
- 18 Locomotives
