= South Dakota =

U.S. state

South Dakota Dakȟóta itókaga (Dakota)
- State
- Flag Seal
- Nickname: The Mount Rushmore State (official)
- Motto(s): Under God, the People Rule
- Anthem: "Hail, South Dakota!"
- Location of South Dakota within the United States
- Country: United States
- Before statehood: Dakota Territory
- Admitted to the Union: November 2, 1889 (39th/40th)
- Capital: Pierre
- Largest city: Sioux Falls
- Largest county or equivalent: Minnehaha County
- Largest metro and urban areas: Sioux Falls

Government
  - Governor: Larry Rhoden (R)
  - Lieutenant Governor: Tony Venhuizen (R)
- Legislature: South Dakota Legislature
  - Upper house: Senate
  - Lower house: House of Representatives
- Judiciary: South Dakota Supreme Court
- U.S. senators: John Thune (R); Mike Rounds (R)
- U.S. House delegation: Dusty Johnson (R) (list)

Area
  - Total: 77,116 sq mi (199,729 km^{2})
  - Land: 75,810 sq mi (196,350 km^{2})
  - Water: 1,305 sq mi (3,379 km^{2}) 1.7%
  - Rank: 17th

Dimensions
  - Length: 380 mi (610 km)
  - Width: 210 mi (340 km)
- Elevation: 2,200 ft (670 m)
- Highest elevation (Black Elk Peak (Note: Elevation adjusted to North American Vertical Datum of 1988)): 7,244 ft (2,208 m)
- Lowest elevation (Big Stone Lake on Minnesota border): 968 ft (295 m)

Population (2025)
  - Total: ▲935,094
  - Rank: 46th
  - Density: 11.5/sq mi (4.44/km^{2})
  - Rank: 46th
  - Median household income: $71,800 (2023)
  - Income rank: 33rd
- Demonym: South Dakotan

Language
  - Official language: English, Sioux (official indigenous language)
  - Spoken language: English, Spanish (2.06%), Dakota (1.39%), German (1.37%)

Time zones
- Eastern half: UTC−06:00 (CST)
  - Summer (DST): UTC−05:00 (CDT)
- Western half: UTC−07:00 (MST)
  - Summer (DST): UTC−06:00 (MDT)
- USPS abbreviation: SD
- ISO 3166 code: US-SD
- Traditional abbreviation: S.D., S.Dak.
- Latitude: 42°29′ N to 45°56′ N
- Longitude: 96°26′ W to 104°03′ W
- Website: sd.gov

South Dakota (/dəˈkoʊtə/ də-KOH-tə; Dakota: Dakȟóta itókaga, pronounced [daˈkˣota iˈtokaga]) is a landlocked state in the Upper Midwest region of the United States. It is also part of the Great Plains. South Dakota is named after the Dakota Sioux tribe, which comprises a large portion of the population and has historically dominated the territory. South Dakota is the 17th-largest by area, the fifth-least populous, and the fifth-least densely populated of the 50 United States. Pierre is the state capital, and Sioux Falls, with a population of about 213,900, is the most populous city. The Missouri River bisects the state into two geographically and socially distinct halves colloquially known as "East River" and "West River". South Dakota is bordered by North Dakota to the north, Minnesota to the east, Iowa to the southeast, Nebraska to the south, Wyoming to the west, and Montana to the northwest.

Humans have inhabited the area for several millennia, with the Sioux becoming dominant by the early 19th century. In the late 19th century, European-American settlement intensified after a gold rush in the Black Hills and the construction of railroads from the east. Encroaching miners and settlers triggered a number of Indian wars, ending with the Wounded Knee Massacre in 1890. As the southern part of the former Dakota Territory, South Dakota became a state on November 2, 1889, simultaneously with North Dakota. They are the 39th and 40th states admitted to the union; President Benjamin Harrison shuffled the statehood papers before signing them so that no one could tell which became a state first.

Major events in the 20th century included the Dust Bowl and Great Depression, increased federal spending during the 1940s and 1950s for agriculture and defense, and the industrialization of agriculture, which has reduced family farming. Eastern South Dakota is home to most of its population, and a variety of crops grow in the area's fertile soil. West of the Missouri River, ranching is the predominant agricultural activity, and the economy is more dependent on tourism and defense spending. Most of the Native American reservations are in West River. The Black Hills, a range of prominent pine-covered mountains sacred to the Sioux, is in the southwest part of the state, and contains Mount Rushmore, a major tourist destination. South Dakota has a temperate continental climate, with four distinct seasons and precipitation levels ranging from moderate in the east to semiarid in the west. The state's ecology features species typical of a North American grassland biome.

Several Democrats represented South Dakota for multiple terms in both chambers of Congress, but the state government is largely controlled by the Republican Party, whose nominees have won the state in each of the last 14 presidential elections. Historically dominated by an agricultural economy and a rural lifestyle, South Dakota has recently sought to diversify its economy to attract and retain residents. South Dakota's history and rural character still strongly influence its culture.

== History ==
=== Early history ===
Humans have lived in what is today South Dakota for several thousand years. The first inhabitants were Paleoindian hunter-gatherers, and disappeared from the area around 5000 BC. Between 500 AD and 800 AD, a semi-nomadic people known as the Mound Builders lived in central and eastern South Dakota. In the 14th century, the Crow Creek Massacre occurred, in which several hundred men, women, and children were killed near the Missouri River.

By 1500, the Arikara (or Ree) had settled in much of the Missouri River valley. European contact with the area began in 1743, when the LaVérendrye brothers explored the region. The LaVérendrye group buried a plate near the site of modern-day Pierre, claiming the region for France as part of greater Louisiana. In 1762 the entire region became part of the Spanish Louisiana until 1802. By the early 19th century, the Sioux had largely replaced the Arikara as the dominant group in the area.

=== American settlement and statehood ===
In 1803, the United States purchased the Louisiana Territory, an area that included most of South Dakota, from Napoleon Bonaparte, and President Thomas Jefferson organized the Lewis and Clark Expedition to explore the region. In 1817, an American fur trading post was set up at present-day Fort Pierre, after which began continuous American settlement of the area. In 1855, the U.S. Army bought Fort Pierre, but abandoned it in 1857 in favor of Fort Randall to the south. Americans and Europeans were by that time rapidly settling in the area, and in 1858 the Yankton Sioux signed the 1858 Treaty, which ceded most of present-day eastern South Dakota to the United States.

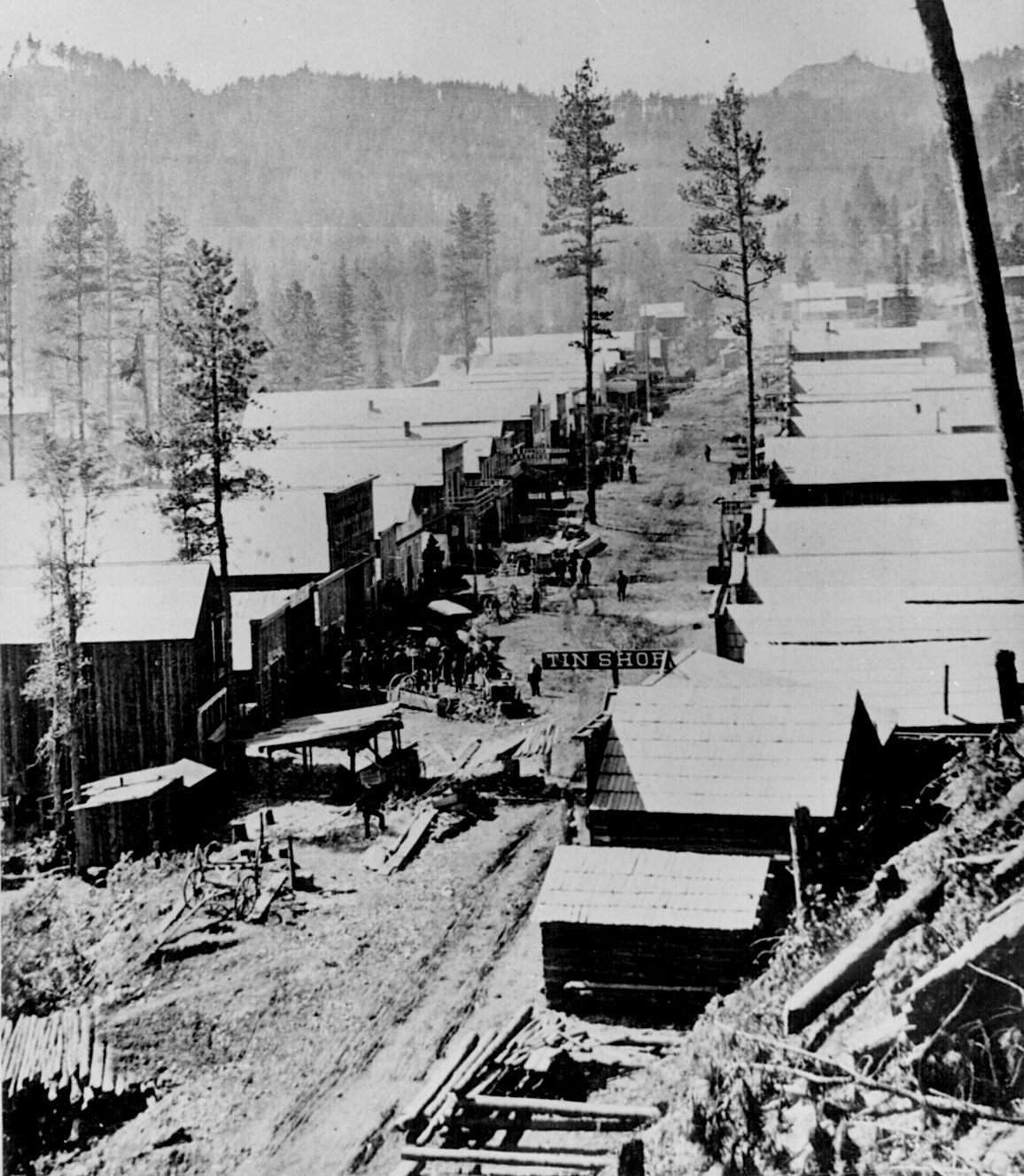
Deadwood, like many other Black Hills towns, was founded after the discovery of gold.

Land speculators founded two of eastern South Dakota's largest present-day cities: Sioux Falls in 1856 and Yankton in 1859. In 1861, the United States government established Dakota Territory in 1861 (this initially included North Dakota, South Dakota, and parts of Montana and Wyoming). Settlement of the area—mostly by people from the eastern United States as well as western and northern Europe—increased rapidly after the passage of the Homestead Acts, and especially after the completion of an eastern railway link to Yankton in 1873, in a period known as the Dakota Boom.

In 1874, gold was discovered in the Black Hills during a military expedition led by George A. Custer and miners and explorers began illegally entering land promised to the Lakota. Custer's expedition took place despite the fact that the Sioux had been granted the entire western half of present-day South Dakota (West River) in 1868 by the Treaty of Laramie as part of the Great Sioux Reservation. The Sioux declined to grant mining rights or land in the Black Hills, and war broke out after the U.S. failed to stop white miners and settlers from entering the region. Eventually, the U.S. won and broke up the Great Sioux Reservation into five reservations and settled the Lakota there. In 1980, the Supreme Court and Congress ordered compensation to be offered, but the Lakota still refuse to accept it, insisting on return of their land.

A harvest in South Dakota, 1898

A growing population in the Dakota Territory caused political dissatisfaction between northern and southern territory residents, with the southern half being always more populated. Following the territorial capital being moved from Yankton to Bismarck in the northern part, calls for dividing the territory increased. South Dakota held constitutional conventions in 1883, 1885, and 1889. Other account(s) state that the real reason for the split was a political lure for four Republican senators instead of two from the Republican-dominated Dakota Territory and in their push to split the territory, Republican congressmen also ignored the uncomfortable fact that much of the land in the anticipated state of South Dakota belonged to the Sioux. Eventually, in the 1887 general election, Dakota Territory residents voted for the division.

On February 22, 1889, outgoing Democratic President Cleveland signed a bill dividing the Territory of Dakota in half and authorizing the people of Washington, Montana, North and South Dakota to hold conventions to decide on statehood and produce constitutions. The bill had been passed by a Democratic controlled House of Representatives and a Senate divided 38 Republicans, 37 Democrats, and one independent.

The four new states would be admitted into the Union in November 1889. Republican President Benjamin Harrison signed proclamations formally admitting South Dakota and North Dakota to the union on November 2, 1889. Harrison had the papers shuffled to obscure which one was signed first and the order went unrecorded.

On December 29, 1890, the Wounded Knee Massacre occurred on the Pine Ridge Indian Reservation. Commonly cited as the last major armed conflict between the United States and the Lakota Sioux Nation, the massacre resulted in the deaths of at least 146 Sioux, many of them women and children. 31 U.S. soldiers were also killed in the conflict.

=== 20th century and beyond ===
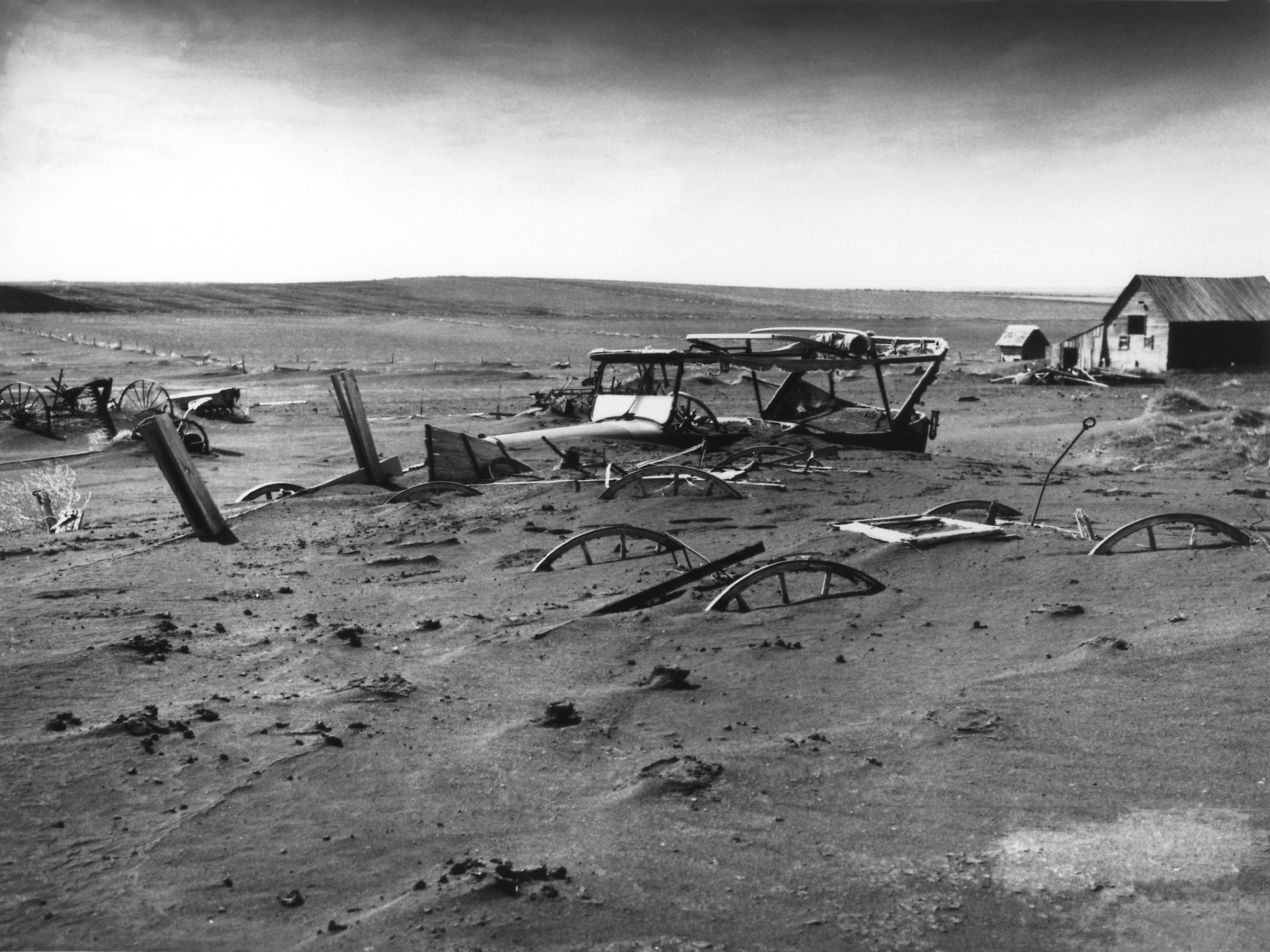
A South Dakota farm during the Dust Bowl, 1936. Normal tillage practices turn South Dakota's fragile soil into a fine, loose powder that blows away, and sometimes covered vehicles, equipment, and buildings with dust during the Dust Bowl.

During the 1930s, several economic and climatic conditions combined with disastrous results for South Dakota. A lack of rainfall, extremely high temperatures and inappropriate cultivation techniques produced what was known as the Dust Bowl in South Dakota and several other plains states. Fertile topsoil was blown away in massive dust storms, and several harvests were completely ruined. The experiences of the Dust Bowl, coupled with local bank foreclosures and the general economic effects of the Great Depression, resulted in many South Dakotans leaving the state. The population of South Dakota declined by more than 7% between 1930 and 1940.

Economic stability returned with the U.S. entry into World War II in 1941, when demand for the state's agricultural and industrial products grew as the nation mobilized for war. In 1944, the Pick–Sloan Plan was passed as part of the Flood Control Act of 1944 by the U.S. Congress, resulting in the construction of six large dams on the Missouri River, four of which are at least partially in South Dakota. Flood control, hydroelectricity, and recreational opportunities such as boating and fishing are provided by the dams and their reservoirs.

In recent decades, South Dakota has been transformed from a state dominated by agriculture to one with a more diversified economy. The tourism industry has grown considerably since the mid-twentieth century, with the Black Hills becoming more important as a destination. The financial service industry began to grow in the state as well, with Citibank moving its credit card operations from New York to Sioux Falls in 1981, a move that has been followed by several other financial companies. South Dakota was the first state to eliminate caps on interest rates.

In 2007, the site of the recently closed Homestake gold mine near Lead was chosen as the location of a new underground research facility, the Deep Underground Science and Engineering Laboratory. Despite a growing state population and recent economic development, many rural areas have been struggling over the past 50 years with locally declining populations and the emigration of educated young adults to larger South Dakota cities, such as Rapid City or Sioux Falls, or to other states. Mechanization and consolidation of agriculture has contributed greatly to the declining number of smaller family farms and the resulting economic and demographic challenges facing rural towns. Gallup-Sharecare State of American Well-Being Rankings in 2018 named South Dakota the happiest, healthiest state in the United States.

== Geography ==
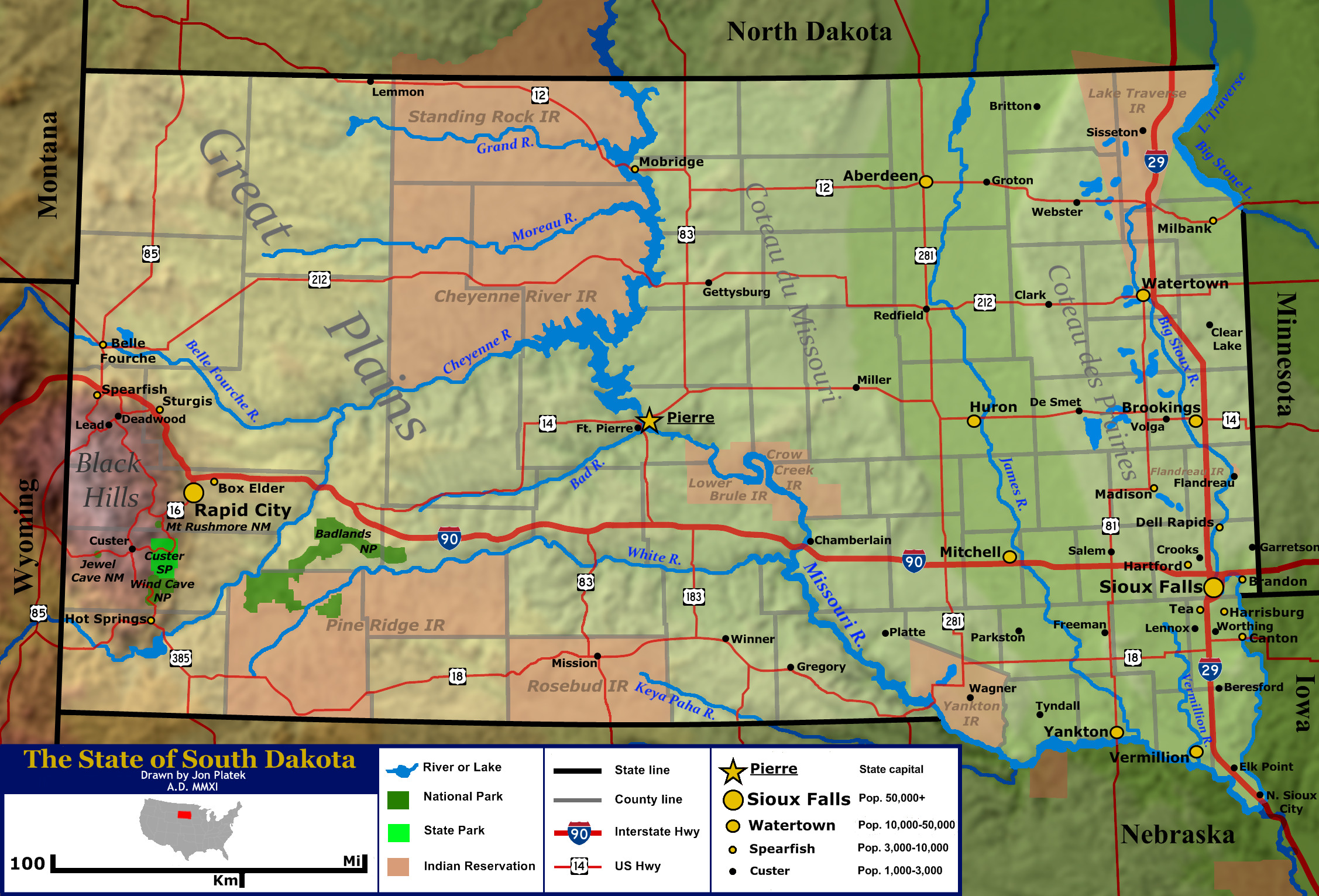
Terrain and primary geographic features of South Dakota

South Dakota is in the north-central United States, and is considered a part of the Midwest administrative grouping by the U.S. Census Bureau; it is also part of the Great Plains region. The culture, economy, and geography of western South Dakota have more in common with the West than the Midwest. South Dakota has a total area of 77,116 square miles (199,730 km^{2}), making the state the 17th largest in the Union.

Black Elk Peak, formerly named Harney Peak, with an elevation of 7,242 ft (2,207 m), is the state's highest point, while the shoreline of Big Stone Lake is the lowest, with an elevation of 966 ft (294 m). South Dakota is bordered to the north by North Dakota; to the south by Nebraska; to the east by Iowa and Minnesota; and to the west by Wyoming and Montana. The geographical center of the U.S. is 17 miles (27 km) west of Castle Rock in Butte County. The North American continental pole of inaccessibility is between Allen and Kyle, 1,024 mi (1,648 km) from the nearest coastline.

The Missouri River is the largest and longest river in the state. Other major South Dakota rivers include the Cheyenne, James, Big Sioux, and White Rivers. Eastern South Dakota has many natural lakes, mostly created by periods of glaciation. Additionally, dams on the Missouri River create four large reservoirs: Lake Oahe, Lake Sharpe, Lake Francis Case, and Lewis and Clark Lake.

=== Regions and geology ===
South Dakota can generally be divided into three regions: eastern South Dakota, western South Dakota, and the Black Hills. The Missouri River serves as a boundary in terms of geographic, social, and political differences between eastern and western South Dakota. The geography of the Black Hills mountains, long considered sacred by Native Americans, differs from its surroundings to such an extent it can be considered separate from the rest of western South Dakota. At times the Black Hills are combined with the rest of western South Dakota, and people often refer to the resulting two regions divided by the Missouri River as West River and East River.

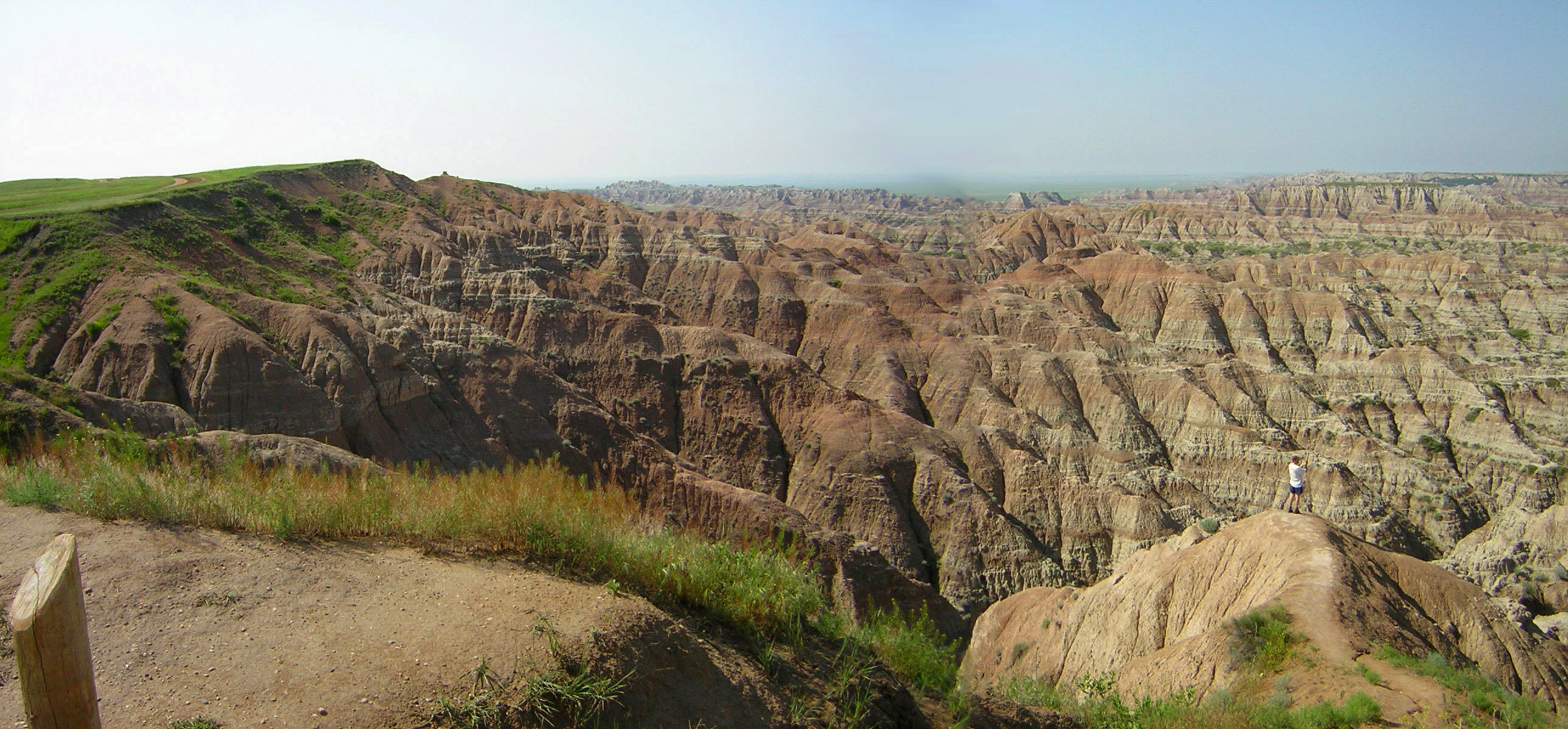
Badlands National Park

Eastern South Dakota generally features higher precipitation and lower topography than the western part of the state. Smaller geographic regions of this area include the Coteau des Prairies, the Dissected Till Plains, and the James River Valley. The Coteau des Prairies is a plateau bordered on the east by the Minnesota River Valley and on the west by the James River Basin. Further west, the James River Basin is mostly low, flat, highly eroded land, following the flow of the James River through South Dakota from north to south. The Dissected Till Plains, an area of rolling hills and fertile soil that covers much of Iowa and Nebraska, extends into the southeastern corner of South Dakota. Layers deposited during the Pleistocene epoch, starting around two million years ago, cover most of eastern South Dakota. These are the youngest rock and sediment layers in the state, the product of several successive periods of glaciation which deposited a large amount of rocks and soil, known as till, over the area.

The Great Plains cover the majority of South Dakota. West of the James River the landscape becomes more arid and rugged, consisting of rolling hills, plains, ravines, and steep flat-topped hills called buttes. In the south, east of the Black Hills, lie the South Dakota Badlands. Erosion from the Black Hills, marine skeletons which fell to the bottom of a large shallow sea that once covered the area, and volcanic material all contribute to the geology of this area.

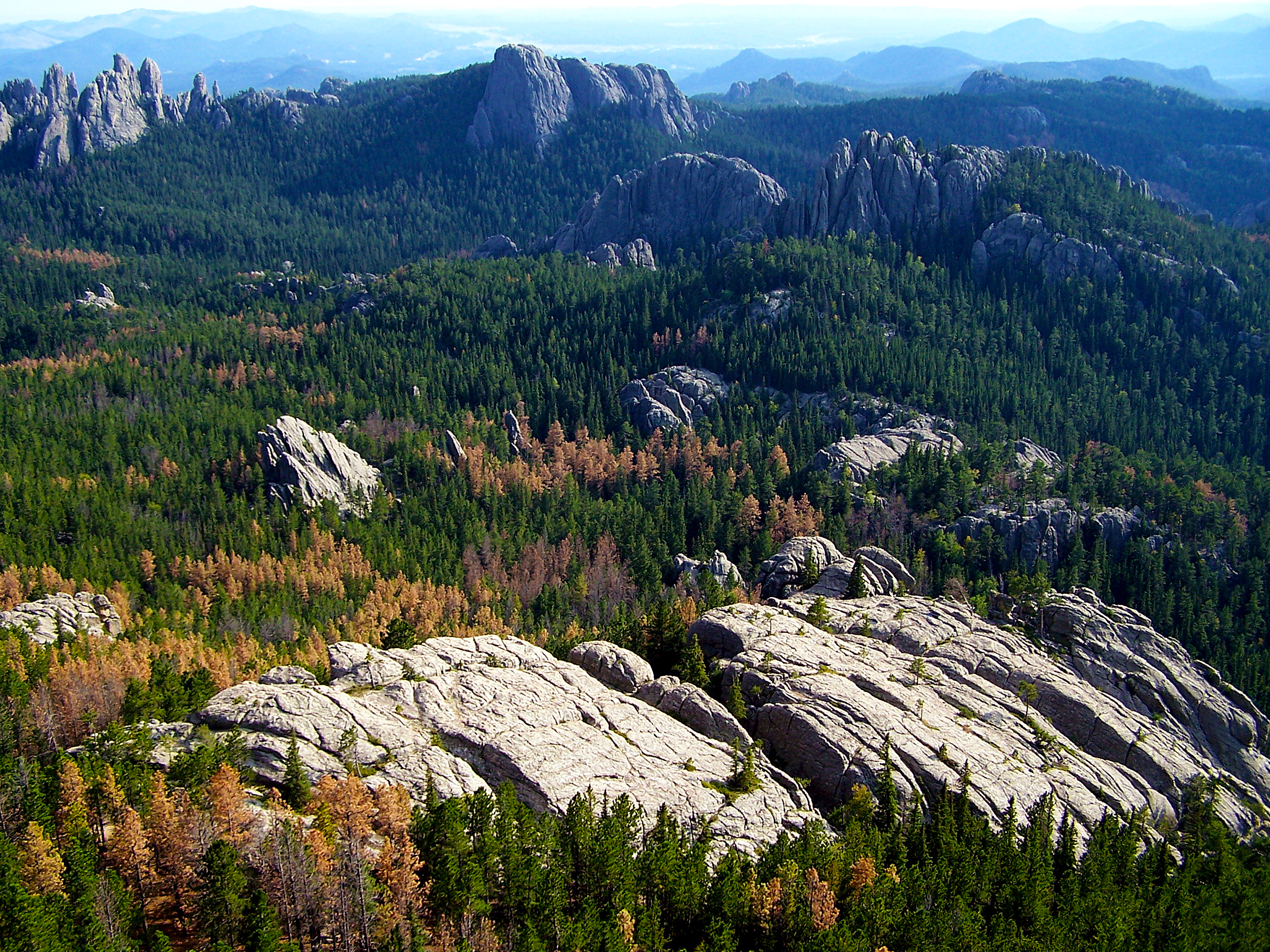
The Black Hills, a low mountain range, is located in Southwestern South Dakota.

The Black Hills are an outlying subrange of the greater Rocky Mountain system in the southwestern part of South Dakota and eastern Wyoming. This range of low mountains covers 6,000 sq mi (16,000 km^{2}), with peaks that rise from 2,000 to 4,000 feet (600 to 1,200 m) above their bases. The Black Hills are the location of Black Elk Peak (7,242 ft or 2,207 m above sea level), the highest point in South Dakota. Two-billion-year-old Precambrian formations, the oldest rocks in the state, form the central core of the Black Hills. Formations from the Paleozoic Era form the outer ring of the Black Hills; these were created between roughly 540 and 250 million years ago. This area features rocks such as limestone, which were deposited here when the area formed the shoreline of an ancient inland sea.

=== Ecology ===
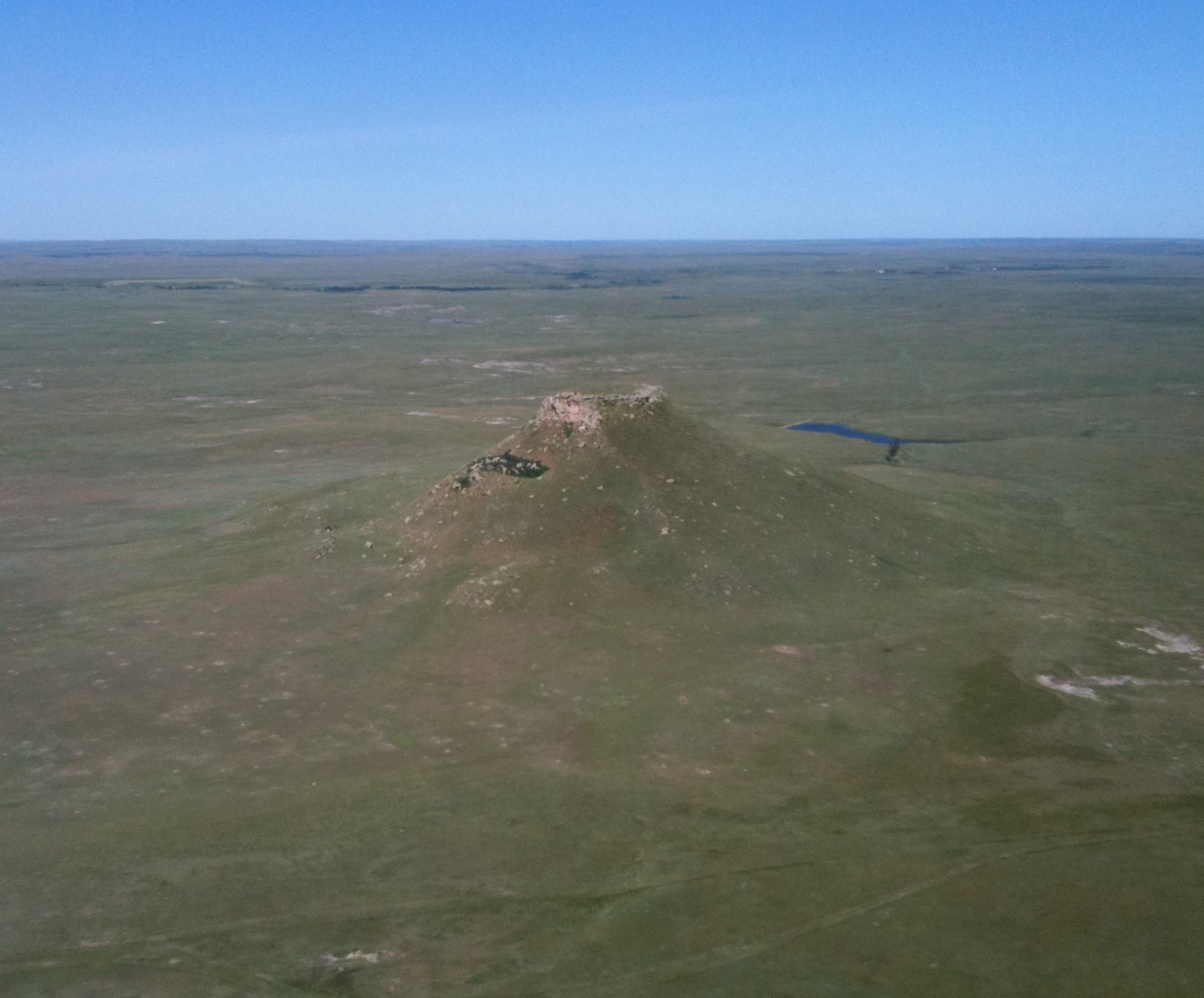
Much of western South Dakota features buttes.

Much of South Dakota (except for the Black Hills area) is dominated by a temperate grassland biome. Although grasses and crops cover most of this region, deciduous trees such as cottonwoods, elms, and willows are common near rivers and in shelter belts. Mammals in this area include bison, deer, pronghorn, coyotes, and prairie dogs. The state bird, the ring-necked pheasant, has adapted well to the area after being introduced from China. Growing populations of bald eagles are spread throughout the state, especially near the Missouri River. Rivers and lakes of the grasslands support populations of walleye, carp, pike, bass, and other species. The Missouri River also contains the pre-historic paddlefish.

Due to a higher elevation and level of precipitation, the Black Hills ecology differs significantly from that of the plains. The mountains are thickly blanketed by various types of pines, including ponderosa and lodgepole pines, as well as spruces. Black Hills mammals include deer, elk (wapiti), bighorn sheep, mountain goats, pine marten, and mountain lions, while the streams and lakes contain several species of trout.

=== Climate ===
Köppen climate types in South Dakota

South Dakota has a continental climate with four distinct seasons, ranging from cold, dry winters to warm and semi-humid summers. During the summers, the state's average high temperature is often close to 90 °F (32 °C), although it cools to near 60 °F (16 °C) at night. It is not unusual for South Dakota to have severe hot, dry spells in the summer with the temperature climbing above 100 °F (38 °C) several times a year. Winters are cold with January high temperatures averaging below freezing and low temperatures averaging below 10 °F (−12 °C) in most of the state. The highest recorded temperature is 120 °F (49 °C) at Usta on July 15, 2006 and the lowest recorded temperature is −58 °F (−50 °C) at McIntosh on February 17, 1936.

Average annual precipitation in South Dakota ranges from semi-arid conditions in the northwestern part of the state (around 15 inches or 380 mm) to semi-humid around the southeast portion of the state (around 25 inches or 640 mm), although a small area centered on Lead in the Black Hills has the highest precipitation at nearly 30 inches (760 mm) per year.

South Dakota summers bring frequent, sometimes severe, thunderstorms with high winds, thunder, and hail. The state's eastern part is often considered part of Tornado Alley, and South Dakota experiences an average of 30 tornadoes each year. Severe blizzards and ice storms often occur during winter.

Average daily high and low temperatures in °F (°C) for locations in South Dakota, colored and sortable by average monthly temperature
Place	Jan	Feb	Mar	Apr	May	Jun	Jul	Aug	Sep	Oct	Nov	Dec
Aberdeen	24 / 6 (−4 / −14)	29 / 11 (−2 / −12)	42 / 23 (6 / −5)	59 / 35 (15 / 2)	70 / 47 (21 / 8)	79 / 57 (26 / 14)	84 / 61 (29 / 16)	82 / 58 (28 / 14)	73 / 49 (23 / 9)	58 / 36 (14 / 2)	41 / 22 (5 / −6)	27 / 10 (−3 / −12)
Huron	27 / 9 (−3 / −13)	32 / 14 (0 / −10)	45 / 25 (7 / −4)	60 / 37 (16 / 3)	71 / 48 (22 / 9)	80 / 58 (27 / 14)	86 / 63 (30 / 17)	83 / 61 (28 / 16)	75 / 51 (24 / 11)	60 / 51 (16 / 11)	43 / 25 (6 / −4)	30 / 13 (−1 / −11)
Rapid City	37 / 18 (3 / −8)	40 / 20 (4 / −7)	49 / 27 (9 / −3)	59 / 36 (15 / 2)	68 / 46 (20 / 8)	78 / 55 (26 / 13)	86 / 61 (30 / 16)	85 / 60 (29 / 16)	75 / 50 (24 / 10)	61 / 39 (16 / 4)	47 / 28 (8 / −2)	37 / 19 (3 / −7)
Sioux Falls	27 / 10 (−3 / −12)	32 / 15 (0 / −9)	45 / 26 (7 / −3)	60 / 38 (16 / 3)	71 / 49 (22 / 9)	80 / 59 (27 / 15)	84 / 64 (29 / 18)	81 / 61 (27 / 16)	74 / 52 (23 / 11)	60 / 39 (16 / 4)	43 / 26 (6 / −3)	30 / 14 (−1 / −10)

=== National parks and monuments ===
Mount Rushmore in the Black Hills

South Dakota has several sites administered by the National Park Service. Two national parks have been established in the state, both in its southwestern region. Wind Cave National Park, established in 1903 in the Black Hills, has an extensive cave network and is home to a large herd of bison. Badlands National Park was established in 1978, and features an eroded, brightly colored landscape surrounded by semi-arid grasslands. Mount Rushmore National Memorial in the Black Hills was established in 1925. The sculpture of four U.S. presidents was carved into the mountainside by sculptor Gutzon Borglum.

Other areas managed by the National Park Service include Jewel Cave National Monument near Custer, the Lewis and Clark National Historic Trail, the Minuteman Missile National Historic Site, which features a decommissioned nuclear missile silo and a separate missile control area several miles away, and the Missouri National Recreational River. The Crazy Horse Memorial is a large mountainside sculpture near Mount Rushmore being built using private funds. The Mammoth Site near Hot Springs is another privately owned attraction in the Black Hills. It is a working paleontological dig and has one of the world's largest concentrations of mammoth remains.

== Demographics ==
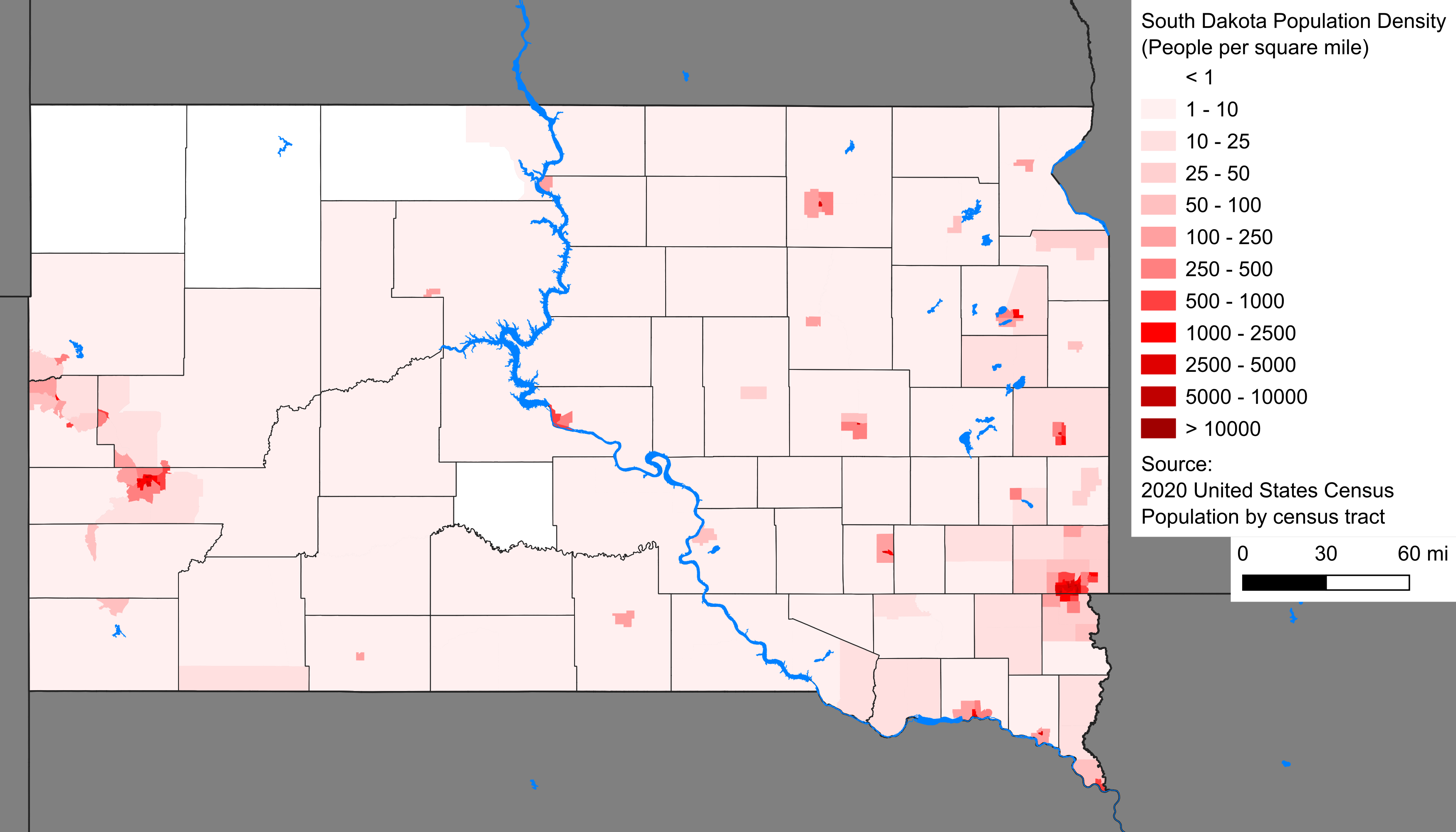
South Dakota population density map

Historical population
Census	Pop.	Note	%±
1860	4,837		—
1870	11,776		143.5%
1880	98,268		734.5%
1890	348,600		254.7%
1900	401,570		15.2%
1910	583,888		45.4%
1920	636,547		9.0%
1930	692,849		8.8%
1940	642,961		−7.2%
1950	652,740		1.5%
1960	680,514		4.3%
1970	665,507		−2.2%
1980	690,768		3.8%
1990	696,004		0.8%
2000	754,844		8.5%
2010	814,180		7.9%
2020	886,667		8.9%
2025 (est.)	935,094		5.5%
Source: 1910–2020

=== Population ===
At the 2022 estimate South Dakota's population was 909,824 on July 1, 2022, a 2.61% increase since the 2020 United States census.

In 2020, 6.5% of South Dakota's population was reported as under 5, 24.5% under 18, and 17.7% were 65 or older. Females made up approximately 49.7% of the population. As of the 2020 census, South Dakota ranked fifth-lowest in the nation in population and population density; only North Dakota, Alaska, Vermont, and Wyoming have fewer residents.

Of the people residing in South Dakota, 65.7% were born in South Dakota, 31.4% were born in another U.S. state, 0.6% were born in Puerto Rico, U.S. Island areas, or born abroad to American parent(s), and 2.3% were born in another country. The top countries of origin for South Dakota's immigrants and refugees in 2018 were Guatemala, the Philippines, Mexico, Sudan and Ethiopia.

The center of population of South Dakota is in Buffalo County, in the unincorporated county seat of Gann Valley.

According to HUD's 2022 Annual Homeless Assessment Report, there were an estimated 1,389 homeless people in South Dakota.

In 2022, South Dakota had the lowest drug overdose death rate of any US state, at 11.3 per 100,000 people.

=== Race or Hispanic Origin (U.S. Census) ===
According to the 2022 census estimate, the racial composition of the population was:

- 84.2% White alone, percent
- 2.6% Black or African American alone, percent
- 8.5% American Indian and Alaska Native alone, percent
- 1.8% Asian alone, percent
- 0.1% Native Hawaiian and Other Pacific Islander alone, percent
- 2.8% Two or More Races, percent
- 4.9% Hispanic or Latino, percent
- 80.7% White alone, not Hispanic or Latino, percent

Ethnically, 4.9% of South Dakota's population was of Hispanic, Latino, or Spanish origin (they may be of any race). Ethnicity for the remainder of the population is not similarly accounted by the federal government.

South Dakota racial breakdown of population
Racial composition	1990	2000	2010	2020
White	91.6%	88.7%	85.7%	80.7%
Native	7.3%	8.2%	8.8%	8.8%
African American	0.5%	0.6%	1.3%	2.0%
Asian	0.4%	0.6%	0.9%	1.5%
Native Hawaiian and other Pacific Islander	–	–	0.1%	0.1%
Other race	0.2%	0.5%	0.9%	1.7%
Two or more races	–	1.4%	2.1%	5.3%

South Dakota – Racial and ethnic composition Note: the US Census treats Hispanic/Latino as an ethnic category. This table excludes Latinos from the racial categories and assigns them to a separate category. Hispanics/Latinos may be of any race.
Race / Ethnicity (NH = Non-Hispanic)	Pop 2000	Pop 2010	Pop 2020	% 2000	% 2010	% 2020
White alone (NH)	664,585	689,502	705,583	88.04%	84.69%	79.58%
Black or African American alone (NH)	4,563	9,959	17,441	0.60%	1.22%	1.97%
Native American or Alaska Native alone (NH)	60,988	69,476	74,595	8.08%	8.53%	8.41%
Asian alone (NH)	4,316	7,553	13,332	0.57%	0.93%	1.50%
Pacific Islander alone (NH)	219	313	493	0.03%	0.04%	0.06%
Other race alone (NH)	310	458	2,050	0.04%	0.06%	0.23%
Mixed race or Multiracial (NH)	8,960	14,800	34,432	1.19%	1.82%	3.88%
Hispanic or Latino (any race)	10,903	22,119	38,741	1.44%	2.72%	4.37%
Total	754,844	814,180	886,667	100.00%	100.00%	100.00%

Map of counties in South Dakota by racial plurality, per the 2020 U.S. census Legend: | Non-Hispanic White 50–60% 60–70% 70–80% 80–90% 90%+ | Native American 60–70% 70–80% 80–90% 90%+ |

According to the U.S. Census Bureau, 25.4% of South Dakota's population younger than age 1 were 'minorities' as of 2011, meaning they had at least one parent who was not non-Hispanic white.

=== Ethnicity and Place of Origin ===
As of 2000, the five largest ancestry groups in South Dakota are German (40.7%), Norwegian (15.3%), Irish (10.4%), Native American (8.3%), and English (7.1%).

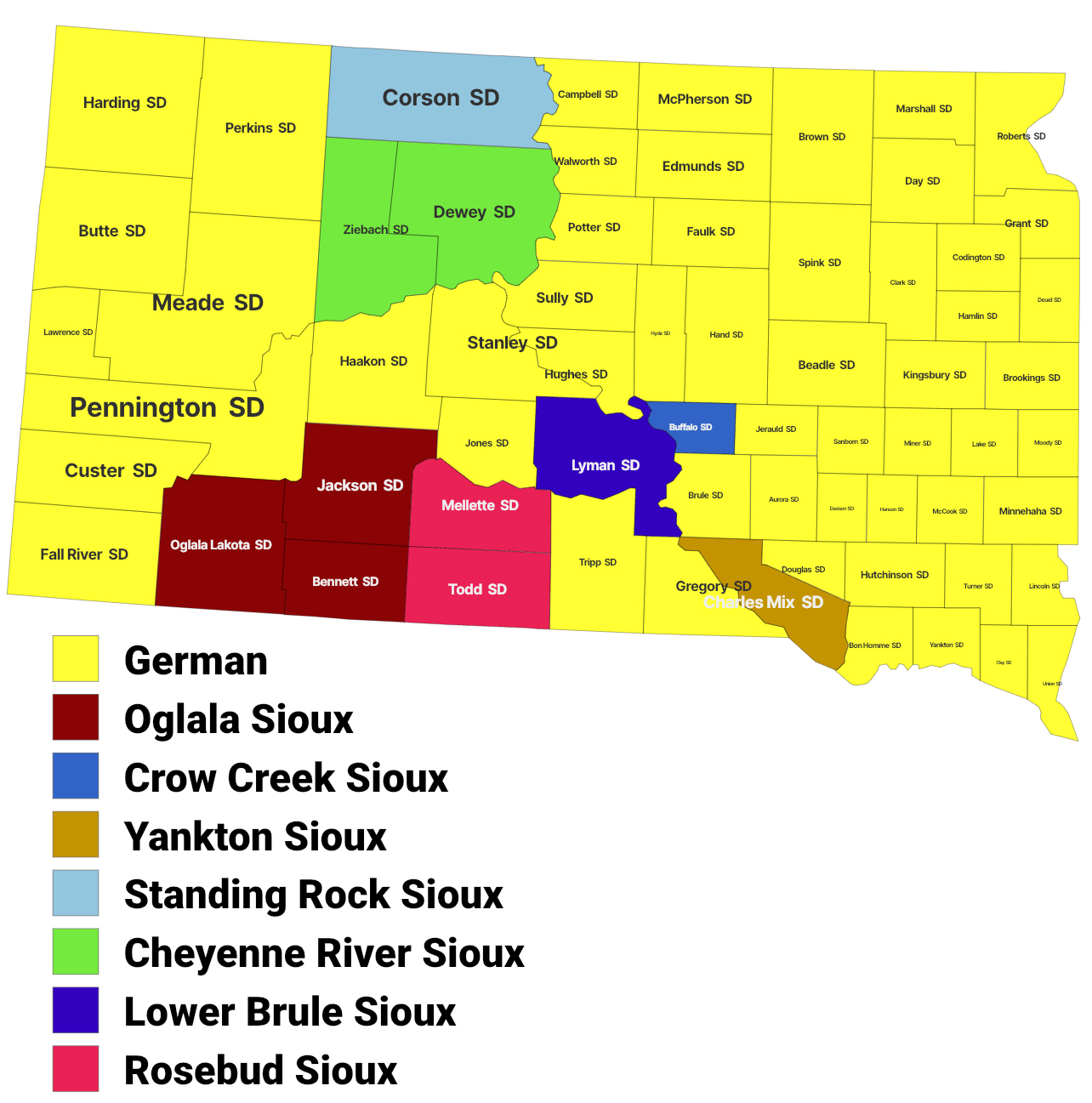
Largest alone or in any combination ethnic origin by county in South Dakota, per the 2020 census

German Americans are the largest ancestry group in most parts of the state, especially in East River (east of the Missouri River), although there are also large Scandinavian-descended populations in some counties. South Dakota has the nation's largest population of Hutterites, a communal Anabaptist group which emigrated in 1874 from German-speaking villages in what today is Ukraine but at that time was part of the Russian Empire.

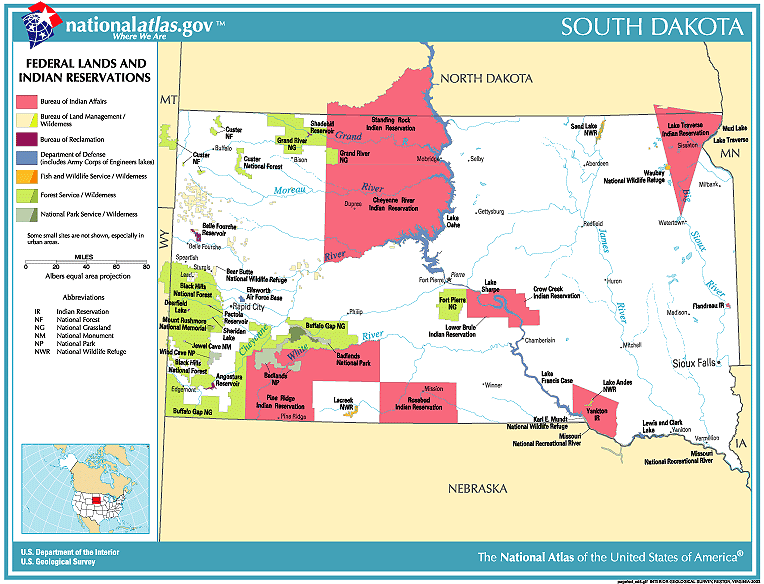
Indian reservations in South Dakota

American Indians, largely Lakota, Dakota, and Nakota (Sioux), are predominant in several counties and constitute 20 percent of the population in West River. The seven large Indian reservations in the state occupy an area much diminished from their former Great Sioux Reservation of West River, which the federal government had once allocated to the Sioux tribes. South Dakota has the third-highest proportion of Native Americans of any state, behind Alaska and New Mexico.

Five of the state's counties are wholly within the boundaries of sovereign Indian reservations. Because of the limitations of climate and land, and isolation from urban areas with more employment opportunities, living standards on many South Dakota reservations are often far below the national average; Ziebach County ranked as the poorest county in the nation in 2009. The unemployment rate in Fort Thompson, on the Crow Creek Reservation, is 70%, and 21% of households lack plumbing or basic kitchen appliances. A 1995 study by the U.S. Census Bureau found 58% of homes on the Pine Ridge Indian Reservation did not have a telephone. The reservations' isolation also inhibits their ability to generate revenue from gaming casinos, an avenue that has proved profitable for many tribes closer to urban centers.

=== Languages ===
In 1995, the legislature passed a law to make English the "common language" of the state. Since 2019, "the language of the Great Sioux Nation, comprised of three dialects, Dakota, Lakota, and Nakota" is the official indigenous language. As of the 2000 census, 1.90% of the population age 5 or older speak German at home, while 1.51% speak Lakota or Dakota, and 1.43% Spanish. As of 2010, 93.46% (692,504) of South Dakota residents age 5 and older spoke English as their primary language. 6.54% of the population spoke a language other than English. 2.06% (15,292) of the population spoke Spanish, 1.39% (10,282) spoke Dakota, and 1.37% (10,140) spoke German. Other languages spoken included Vietnamese (0.16%), Chinese (0.12%), and Russian (0.10%).

=== Growth and rural flight ===
Over the last several decades, the population in many rural areas has declined in South Dakota, in common with other Great Plains states. The change has been characterized as "rural flight" as family farming has declined. Young people have moved to cities for other employment. This trend has continued in recent years, with 30 of South Dakota's counties losing population between the 1990 and the 2000 census. During that time, nine counties had a population loss of greater than 10%, with Harding County, in the northwest corner of the state, losing nearly 19% of its population. Low birth rates and a lack of younger immigration has caused the median age of many of these counties to increase. In 24 counties, at least 20% of the population is over the age of 65, compared with a national rate of 12.8%.

The effect of rural flight has not been spread evenly through South Dakota, however. Although most rural counties and small towns have lost population, the Sioux Falls area, the larger counties along Interstate 29, the Black Hills, and many Indian reservations have all gained population. As the reservations have exercised more sovereignty, some Sioux have returned to them from urban areas. Lincoln County near Sioux Falls was the seventh fastest-growing county (by percentage) in the United States in 2010. The growth in these areas has compensated for losses in the rest of the state. South Dakota's total population continues to increase steadily, albeit at a slower rate than the national average.

A one-night stay in South Dakota is all that is necessary to qualify a person to claim residency in South Dakota. Residency in South Dakota has therefore become very popular among full-time travelers (persons who reside in recreational vehicles, aboard cruise ships, etc.).

=== Religion ===
Religious self-identification, per Public Religion Research Institute's 2022 American Values Survey
1. Christianity (72.0%)
2. Unaffiliated (21.0%)
3. Buddhism (3.00%)
4. New Age (3.00%)
5. Other (1.00%)
6. 0.00%
7. 0.00%

According to the Public Religion Research Institute in 2020, 73% of the adult population were Christian. Per the Pew Research Center's separate 2014 study, the largest religious denominations in Christianity by number of adherents as a percentage of South Dakota's population in 2014 were the Catholic Church with 22 percent, evangelical Protestants with 25 percent, and mainline Protestants with 32 percent. Together, all kinds of Protestants accounted for 57 percent. Those unaffiliated with any religion represented 18 percent of the population. The breakdown of other religions was <1% Muslim, <1% Hindu and 1% Buddhist. The number of Jewish people in South Dakota is under 400, the lowest total in any of the fifty states.

The largest Christian denominations by number of adherents in 2010 were the Roman Catholic Church with 148,883 members; the Evangelical Lutheran Church in America (ELCA) with 112,649 members; and the United Methodist Church (UMC) with 36,020 members. The ELCA and UMC are specific denominations within the broader terms 'Lutheran' and 'Methodist', respectively. Through the Association of Religion Data Archives in 2020, Catholicism remained the largest Christian denomination, followed by the ELCA. Non-denominational Protestants numbered 63,992, becoming the third largest group of Christians throughout the state.

In 2022, the Public Religion Research Institute determined 72% of the state were Christian altogether, though Protestants were 48%, Catholics 22%, and Jehovah's Witnesses 2%. The religiously unaffiliated declined from 22% to 21% between 2020 and 2022. Other non-Christian faith groups with a substantial presence in the South Dakota were Buddhism (3%), New Age (3%), and others at 1% altogether. Through the Association of Religion Data Archives 2020 study, there were 978 adherents to the Baha'i Faith and 535 Muslims.

== Economy ==
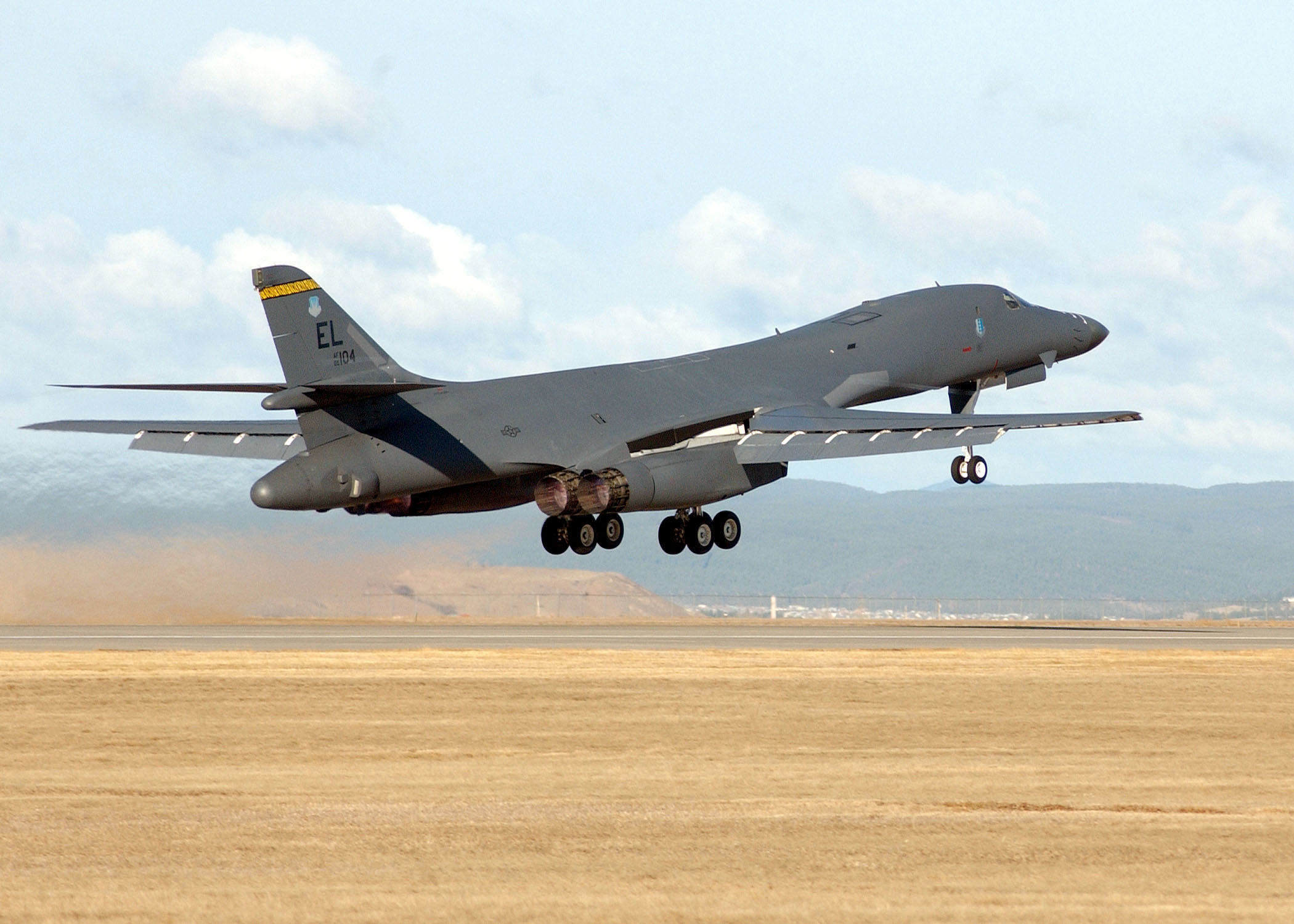
A B-1B Lancer lifts off from Ellsworth Air Force Base, one of South Dakota's largest employers.

The current-dollar gross state product of South Dakota was $80.6 billion as of 2025, the 4th smallest total state output in the U.S. The per capita personal income was $79,297 in 2025, ranked 14th in the U.S., and 12.5% of the population was below the poverty line in 2008. CNBC's list of "Top States for Business for 2025" recognized South Dakota as the 35th best state in the nation. According to the U.S. Small Business Administration's Office of Advocacy, small businesses made up 98.9% of all businesses in South Dakota in 2025 and employed 58% of the state's work force. As of May 2025, the state's unemployment rate was 1.8%.

The service industry is the largest economic contributor in South Dakota. This sector includes the retail, finance, and healthcare industries. Citibank, which was at one time the largest bank holding company in the United States, established national banking operations in South Dakota in 1981 to take advantage of favorable banking regulations. Today the trust fund industry manages hundreds of billions of dollars and is known as a tax haven for foreigners. Government spending is another important segment of the state's economy, providing over ten percent of the gross state product. Ellsworth Air Force Base, near Rapid City, is the second-largest single employer in the state.

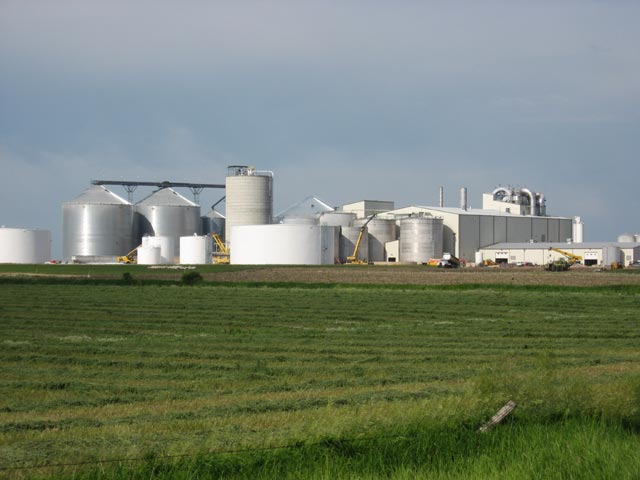
Ethanol plant in Turner County

Agriculture has historically been the key component of the South Dakota economy. Although other industries have expanded rapidly in recent decades, agricultural production is still very important to the state's economy, especially in rural areas. The five most valuable agricultural products in South Dakota are cattle, corn (maize), soybeans, wheat, and hogs. Agriculture-related industries such as meat packing and ethanol production also have a considerable economic impact on the state. South Dakota is the sixth leading ethanol-producing state in the nation.

Another important sector in South Dakota's economy is tourism. Many travel to view the attractions of the state, particularly those in the Black Hills region, such as historic Deadwood, Mount Rushmore, and the nearby state and national parks. One of the largest tourist events in the state is the annual Sturgis Motorcycle Rally. The five-day event drew over 739,000 attendees in 2015; significant considering the state has a total population of 850,000. In 2006, tourism provided an estimated 33,000 jobs in the state and contributed over two billion dollars to the economy of South Dakota.

== Transportation ==
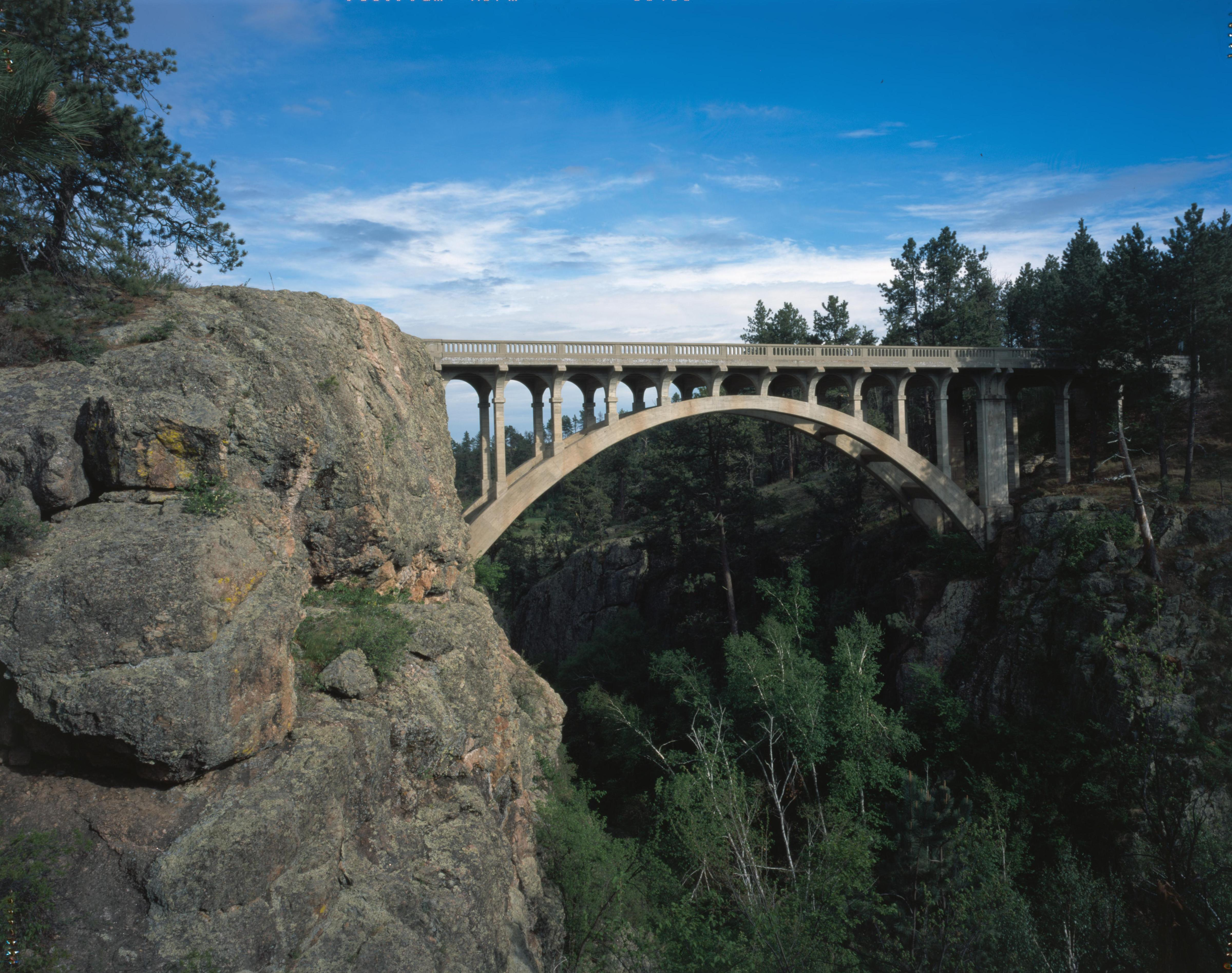
Beaver Creek Bridge in Wind Cave National Park

South Dakota has 83,609 miles (134,556 km) of highways, roads, and streets, along with 679 miles (1,093 km) of interstate highways. Two major interstates pass through South Dakota: Interstate 90, which runs east and west through the southern half of the state; and Interstate 29, running north and south in the eastern portion of the state. The I-29 corridor features generally higher rates of population and economic growth than areas in eastern South Dakota further from the interstate.

Also in the state are the shorter Interstates 190, a spur into central Rapid City, and 229, a loop around southern and eastern Sioux Falls. Several major U.S. highways pass through the state. U.S. routes 12, 14, 16, 18 and 212 travel east and west, while U.S. routes 81, 83, 85 and 281 run north and south. South Dakota and Montana are the only states sharing a land border that is not traversed by a paved road.

South Dakota contains two National Scenic Byways. The Peter Norbeck National Scenic Byway is in the Black Hills, while the Native American Scenic Byway runs along the Missouri River in the north-central part of the state. Other scenic byways include the Badlands Loop Scenic Byway, the Spearfish Canyon Scenic Byway, and the Wildlife Loop Road Scenic Byway.

Railroads have played an important role in South Dakota transportation since the mid-19th century. Some 4,420 miles (7,110 km) of railroad track were built in South Dakota during the late 19th century and early 20th century, but only 1,839 miles (2,960 km) are active. BNSF is the largest railroad in South Dakota; the Rapid City, Pierre & Eastern Railroad (formerly the Dakota, Minnesota and Eastern) is the state's other major carrier. Other state carriers include Dakota Southern Railway, D&I Railroad, Ellis & Eastern, Sunflour Railroad, CPKC, and the Sisseton Milbank Railroad. Rail transportation in the state is mostly freight, but there are two passenger heritage railroads: the Black Hills Central and the Prairie Village, Herman, and Milwaukee. However, South Dakota is one of the two contiguous states that lack Amtrak service. (South Dakota is the only contiguous state that never had Amtrak—Wyoming used to be served by the San Francisco Zephyr and the Pioneer.)

South Dakota's largest commercial airports in terms of passenger traffic are the Sioux Falls Regional Airport and Rapid City Regional Airport. Delta Air Lines, Frontier Airlines, and Allegiant Airlines, as well as commuter airlines using the brand affiliation with major airlines serve the two largest airports. Several other cities in the state also have commercial air service: Aberdeen Regional Airport, Pierre Regional Airport, and Watertown Regional Airport, some of which are subsidized by the Essential Air Service program.

Public transit played a large role in the development of cities in South Dakota. There were seven cities with a streetcar system in the nineteenth and twentieth centuries, however, all of these were discontinued over time. Today, only three fixed route public transit systems exist in the state, those being in Sioux Falls, Rapid City and on the Yankton Reservation.

== Government and politics ==
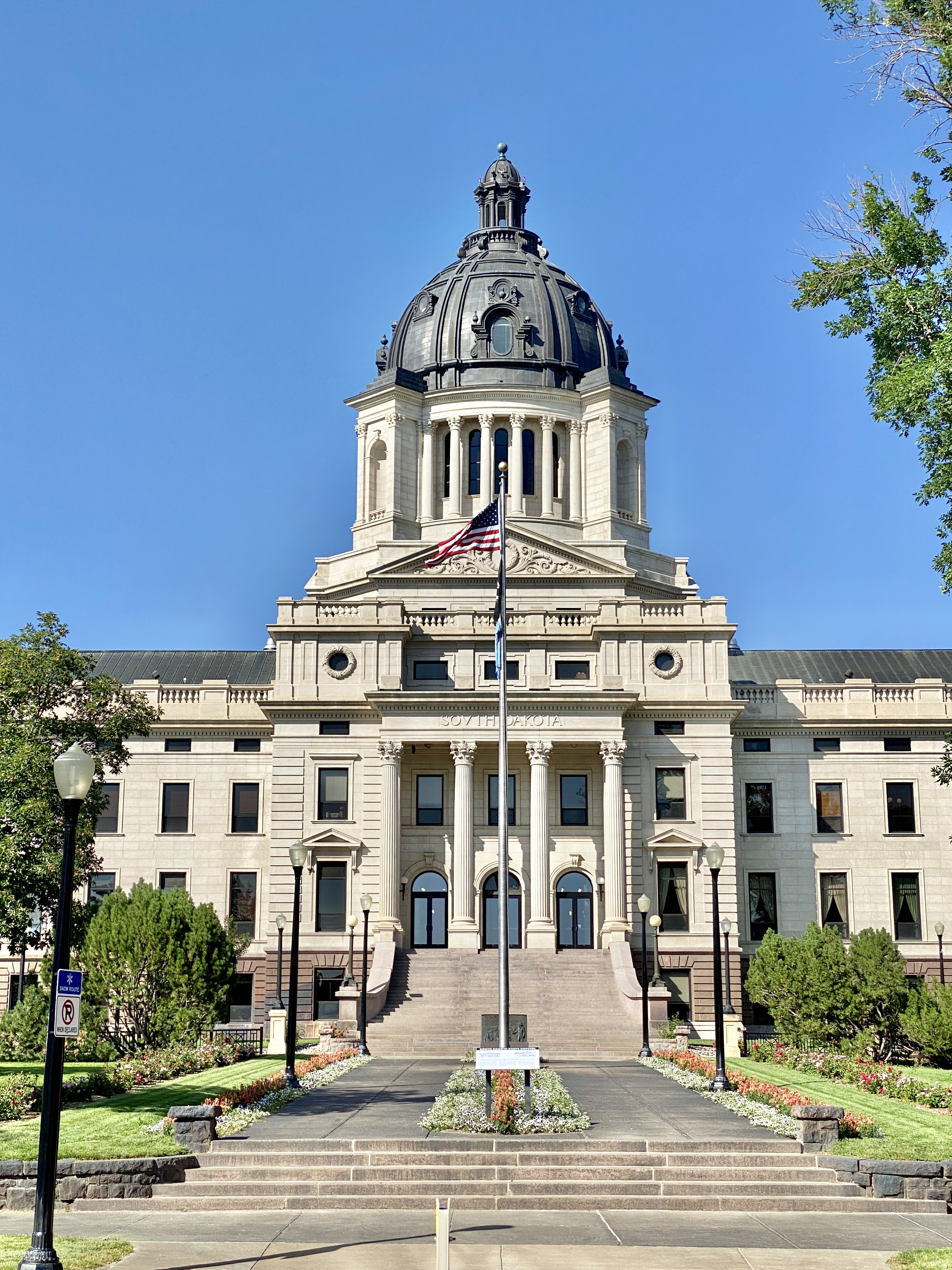
The South Dakota State Capitol in Pierre

=== Government ===
Like other U.S. states, the structure of the government of South Dakota follows the same separation of powers as the federal government, with executive, legislative, and judicial branches. The structure of the state government is laid out in the Constitution of South Dakota, the highest law in the state. The constitution may be amended by a majority vote of both houses of the legislature, or by voter initiative.

The Governor of South Dakota occupies the executive branch of the state government. The current governor is Larry Rhoden, a Republican. The state constitution gives the governor the power to sign into law or veto bills passed by the state legislature, to serve as commander-in-chief of the South Dakota National Guard, to appoint a cabinet, and to commute criminal sentences or to pardon those convicted of crimes. The governor serves for a four-year term, and may not serve more than two consecutive terms.

The state legislature is made up of two bodies, the Senate, which has 35 members, and the House of Representatives, with 70 members. South Dakota is divided into 35 legislative districts, with voters electing two representatives and one senator per district. The legislature meets for an annual session which begins on the second Tuesday in January and lasts for 30 days; it also meets if a special session is called by the governor.

The judicial branch is made up of several levels. The state supreme court, with four justices and a chief justice, is the highest court in the state. Below the supreme court are the circuit courts; 41 circuit judges serve in seven judicial circuits in the state. Below the circuit courts are the magistrate courts, which deal with lesser criminal and civil actions.

=== State taxes ===
As of 2005, South Dakota has the lowest per capita total state tax rate in the United States. The state does not levy personal or corporate income taxes, inheritance taxes, or taxes on intangible personal property. The state sales tax rate is 4.2 percent. Various localities have local levies so in some areas the rate is six percent. The state sales tax does not apply to sales to Indians on Indian reservations, but many reservations have a compact with the state. Businesses on the reservation collect the tax and the state refunds to the Indian Tribes the percentage of sales tax collections relating to the ratio of Indian population to total population in the county or area affected. Ad valorem property taxes are local taxes and are a large source of funding for school systems, counties, municipalities and other local government units. The South Dakota Special Tax Division regulates some taxes including cigarette and alcohol-related taxes.

=== Federal representation ===
South Dakota is represented at the federal level by Senator John Thune, Senator Mike Rounds, and Representative Dusty Johnson. All three are Republicans. South Dakota is one of seven states with only one seat in the U.S. House of Representatives. In United States presidential elections, South Dakota is allotted three of 538 votes in the Electoral College. As in all other states except Maine and neighboring Nebraska, South Dakota's electoral votes are granted in a winner-take-all system.

=== Politics ===
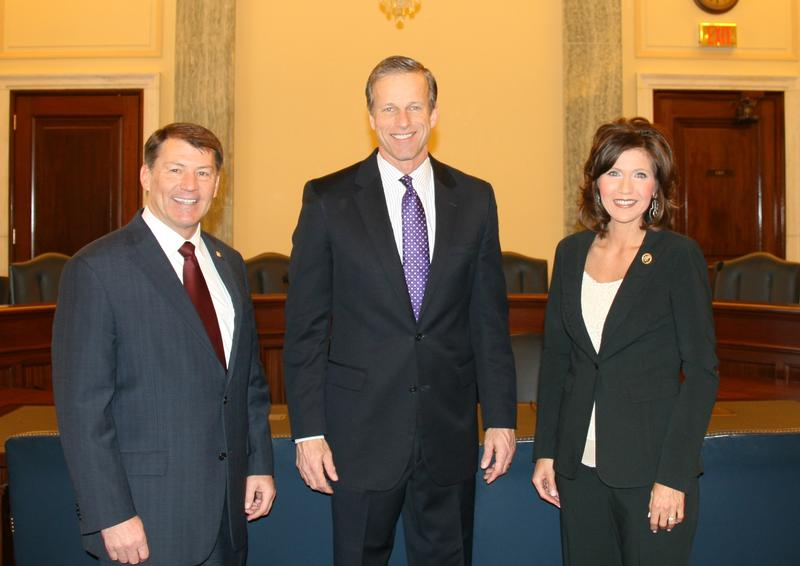
Congressional delegation in 2015: (from left) Senator Mike Rounds, Senator John Thune, and Representative Kristi Noem.

Voter registration as of October 1, 2025:
Party	Total voters	Percentage
Republican	323,536	50.92%
Nonpartisan/Independent	162,972	25.65%
Democratic	144,797	22.78%
Minor parties	4,080	0.64%
Total	635,385	100.00%

South Dakota politics are generally dominated by the Republican Party. Since statehood, Republicans have carried the state's electoral votes in all but five presidential elections: 1896, 1912 (by Theodore Roosevelt's Progressive Party), 1932, 1936 and 1964. (Democrat George McGovern—a native South Dakotan—failed to carry his home state in 1972.) Only Alaska has been carried fewer times by a Democrat. Additionally, a Democrat has not won the governorship since 1974. As of 2024, Republicans hold a 2-to-1 voter registration advantage over Democrats and hold supermajorities in both the state House and the state Senate.

Despite the state's general Republican and conservative leanings, Democrats have found success in various statewide elections, most notably in those involving South Dakota's congressional representatives in Washington. American Indians have been becoming more active in state and county electoral politics. In the 2002 election, American Indian voting carried Tim Johnson as the Democratic candidate by a margin of 532 votes. Until his electoral defeat in 2004, Senator Tom Daschle was the Senate minority leader (and briefly its majority leader during Democratic control of the Senate in 2001–02). Other prominent South Dakota Democrats include former presidential nominees George McGovern and Hubert Humphrey.

In 2016, South Dakota voted for Republican nominee Donald Trump over Democratic nominee Hillary Clinton by a margin of 30%. In 2018, Republican congresswoman Kristi Noem defeated Democrat Billie Sutton in the gubernatorial election by a small margin, and Republican Dusty Johnson defeated Democrat Tim Bjorkman for the state's at-large seat in the U.S. House of Representatives. Noem was sworn in on January 5, 2019, making her the first female governor of the state.

Contemporary political issues in South Dakota include the costs and benefits of the state lottery, South Dakota's relatively low rankings in education spending (particularly teacher pay—recently the State Sales Tax was increased from 4% to 4.5% to finance an increase in teacher pay), and recent legislative and electoral attempts to ban abortion in the state.

A Republican-supported bill passed in March 2019 requires that all public schools display "In God We Trust" in a prominent location.

In a 2020 study, South Dakota was ranked as the 22nd hardest state for citizens to vote in.

== Culture ==
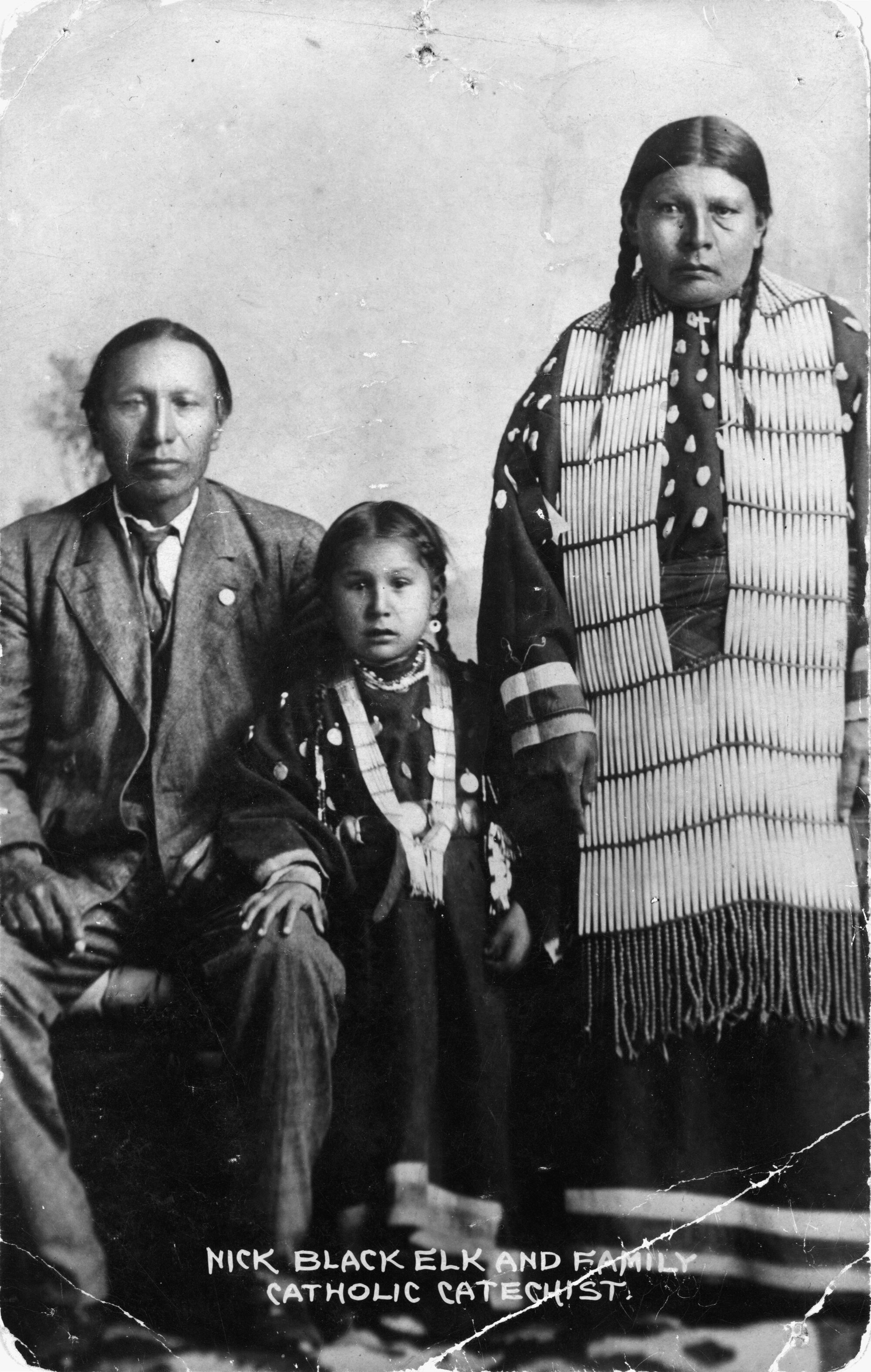
Nicholas Black Elk with his family, circa 1910

South Dakota's culture reflects the state's American Indian, rural, Western, and European roots. A number of annual events celebrating the state's ethnic and historical heritage take place around the state, such as Days of '76 in Deadwood, Czech Days in Tabor, and the annual St. Patrick's Day and Cinco de Mayo festivities in Sioux Falls. The various tribes hold many annual pow wows at their reservations throughout the state, to which non-Native Americans are sometimes invited. Custer State Park holds an annual Buffalo Roundup, in which volunteers on horseback gather the park's herd of around 1,500 bison.

Black Elk (Lakota) was a medicine man and heyokha, whose life spanned the transition to reservations. His accounts of the 19th-century Indian Wars and Ghost Dance movement, and his deep thoughts on personal visions and Native American religion, form the basis of the book Black Elk Speaks, first published in 1932. (Among several editions, a premier annotated edition was published in 2008.) Paul Goble, a children's book author and illustrator, was based in the Black Hills from 1977.

Laura Ingalls Wilder, whose semi-autobiographical books are based on her experiences as a child and young adult on the frontier, is one of South Dakota's best-known writers. She drew from her life growing up on a homestead near De Smet as the basis for five of her novels: By the Shores of Silver Lake, The Long Winter, Little Town on the Prairie, These Happy Golden Years, and The First Four Years. These gained renewed popularity in the United States when Little House on the Prairie was adapted and produced as a television series in 1974. Wilder's daughter, Rose Wilder Lane, who became a well-known writer in her own right, was born near De Smet in 1886.

South Dakota has also produced several notable artists. Harvey Dunn grew up on a homestead near Manchester in the late 19th century. While Dunn worked most of his career as a commercial illustrator, his most famous works showed various scenes of frontier life; he completed these near the end of his career. Oscar Howe (Crow) was born on the Crow Creek Indian Reservation and won fame for his watercolor paintings. Howe was one of the first Native American painters to adopt techniques and style heavily influenced by the mid-20th century abstraction movement, rather than relying on traditional Native American styles. Terry Redlin, originally from Watertown, was an accomplished painter of rural and wildlife scenes. Many of his works are on display at the Redlin Art Center in Watertown.

== Cities and towns ==
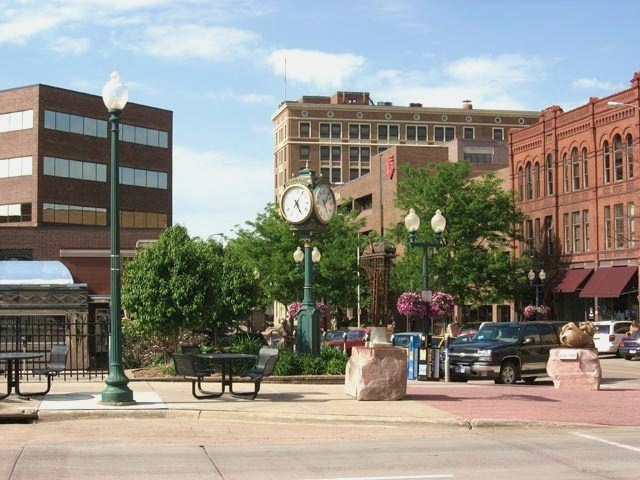
Sioux Falls, with a population of around 192,000, is the largest city in South Dakota.

Sioux Falls is the most populous city in South Dakota, with a 2020 population of 192,517, and a metropolitan area population of 281,958. The city, founded in 1856, is in the southeast corner of the state. Retail, finance, and healthcare have assumed greater importance in Sioux Falls, where the economy was originally centered on agri-business and quarrying.

Rapid City, with a 2020 population of 74,703, and a metropolitan area population of 144,558, is the second-largest city in the state. It is on the eastern edge of the Black Hills, and was founded in 1876. Rapid City's economy is largely based on tourism and defense spending, because of the proximity of many tourist attractions in the Black Hills and Ellsworth Air Force Base.

The next eight largest cities in the state, in order of descending 2010 population, are Aberdeen (28,495), Brookings (23,337), Watertown (22,655), Mitchell (15,660), Yankton (15,411), Huron (14,263), Pierre (14,091), and Spearfish (12,193). Pierre is the state capital, and Brookings and Vermillion are the locations of the state's two largest universities (South Dakota State University and University of South Dakota, respectively). With a population of about 14,000, Pierre is the second smallest state capital in the United States. Of the ten largest cities in the state, only Rapid City and Spearfish are west of the Missouri River.

== Media ==
South Dakota's first newspaper, the Dakota Democrat, began publishing in Yankton in 1858. Today, the state's largest newspaper is the Sioux Falls Argus Leader, with a Sunday circulation of 63,701 and a weekday circulation of 44,334. The Rapid City Journal, with a Sunday circulation of 32,638 and a weekday circulation of 27,827, is South Dakota's second-largest newspaper. The next four largest newspapers in the state are the Aberdeen American News, the Watertown Public Opinion, the Huron Plainsman, and the Brookings Register. In 1981, Tim Giago founded the Lakota Times as a newspaper for the local American Indian community on the Pine Ridge Indian Reservation. The newspaper, now published in New York and known as Indian Country Today, is available in every state in the country. The Sioux City Journal also covers parts of South Dakota.

There are nine television stations broadcasting in South Dakota; South Dakota Public Television broadcasts from a number of locations around the state, while the other stations broadcast from Sioux Falls or Rapid City. The two largest television media markets in South Dakota are Sioux Falls-Mitchell, with a viewership of 246,020, and Rapid City, with a viewership of 91,070. The two markets rank as 114th and 177th largest in the United States, respectively. The state's first television station, KELO-TV, began airing in Sioux Falls in 1953. Among KELO's early programs was Captain 11, an afternoon children's program. Captain 11 ran from 1955 until 1996, making it the nation's longest continuously running children's television program.

A number of South Dakotans are famous for their work in television and publishing. Former NBC Nightly News anchor and author Tom Brokaw is from Webster and Yankton, USA Today founder Al Neuharth was from Eureka and Alpena, gameshow host Bob Barker spent much of his childhood in Mission, and entertainment news hosts Pat O'Brien and Mary Hart are from Sioux Falls.

== Education ==
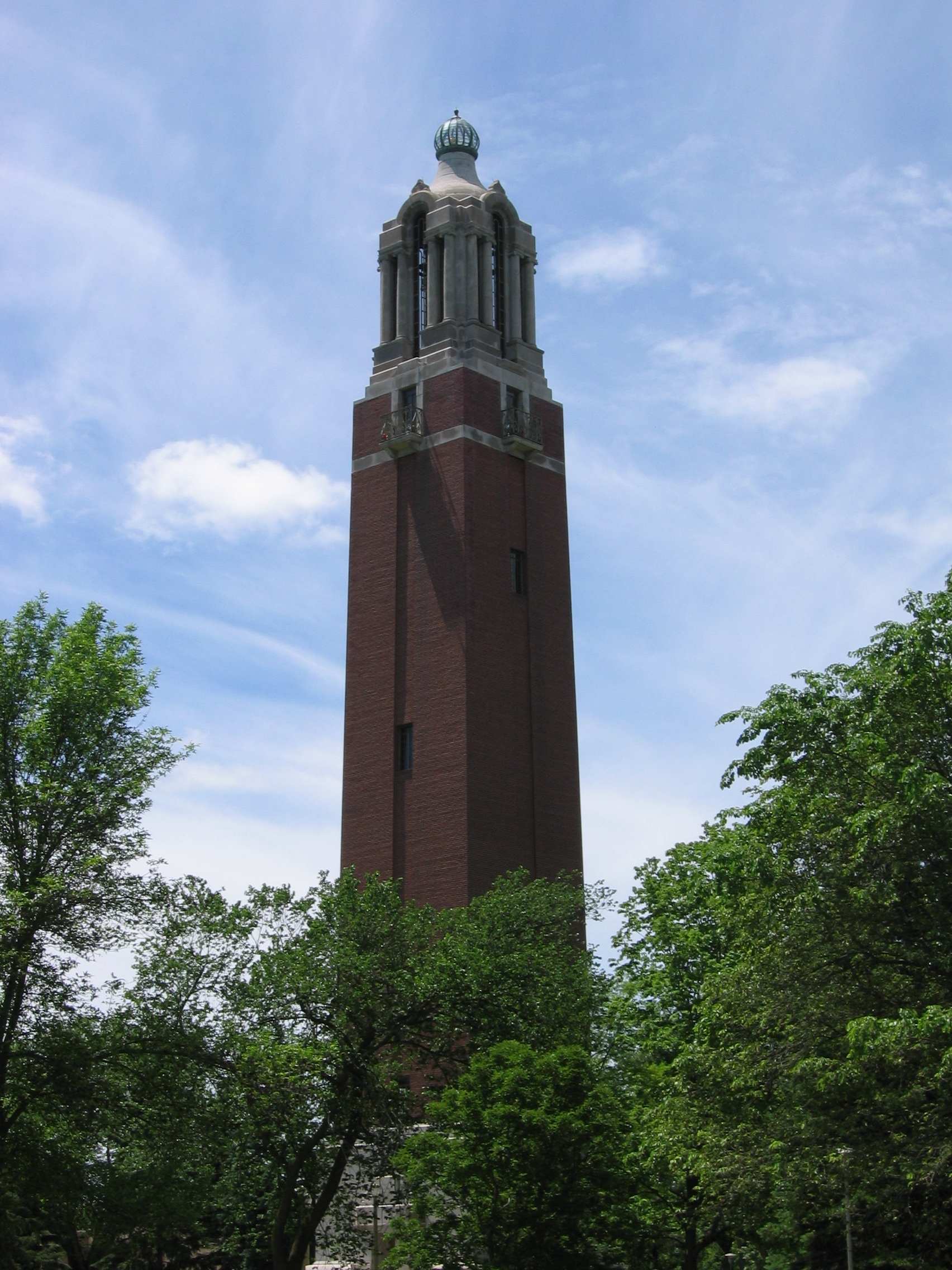
The Coughlin Campanile, a landmark on the campus of South Dakota State University in Brookings

As of 2006, South Dakota has a total primary and secondary school enrollment of 136,872, with 120,278 of these students being educated in the public school system. There are 703 public schools in 168 school districts, giving South Dakota the highest number of schools per capita in the United States. The current high school graduation rate is 89.9%, and the average ACT score is 21.8, slightly above the national average of 21.1. 89.8% of the adult population has earned at least a high school diploma, and 25.8% has earned a bachelor's degree or higher. South Dakota's 2008 average public school teacher salary of $36,674 was the lowest in the nation (national average was $52,308). In 2007 South Dakota passed legislation modeled after Montana's Indian Education for All Act (1999), mandating education about Native American tribal history, culture, and heritage in all the schools, from pre-school through college, in an effort to increase knowledge and appreciation about Indian culture among all residents of the state, as well as to reinforce Indian students' understanding of their own cultures' contributions.

The South Dakota Board of Regents, whose members are appointed by the governor, controls the six public universities in the state. South Dakota State University (SDSU), in Brookings, is the state's largest university, with an enrollment of 12,831. The University of South Dakota (USD), in Vermillion, is the state's oldest university, and has South Dakota's only law school and medical school. South Dakota also has several private universities, the largest of which is Augustana University in Sioux Falls.

== Sports and recreation ==
=== Organized sports ===
Because of its low population, South Dakota does not host any major league professional sports franchises. The state has minor league and independent league teams, all of which play in Sioux Falls or Rapid City. Sioux Falls is home to four teams: the Sioux Falls Canaries (baseball), the Sioux Falls Skyforce (basketball), the Sioux Falls Stampede (hockey), and the Sioux Falls Storm (indoor American football). The Canaries play in the American Association, and their home field is Sioux Falls Stadium. The Skyforce plays in the NBA G League and is owned by the NBA's Miami Heat. It plays at the Sanford Pentagon. The Stampede and Storm share the Denny Sanford Premier Center. The Stampede plays in the USHL, and the Storm plays in the IFL. Rapid City has a hockey team named the Rapid City Rush that plays in the ECHL. The Rush began its inaugural season in 2008 at the Rushmore Plaza Civic Center.

Universities in South Dakota host a variety of sports programs. For many years, South Dakota was one of the only states in the country without an NCAA Division I football or basketball team. However, the South Dakota State Jackrabbits decided to move their teams from Division II to Division I in 2007, a move followed by the South Dakota Coyotes in 2011. Other universities in the state compete at the NCAA's Division II level, or in the NAIA.

Famous South Dakota athletes include Billy Mills, Mike Miller, Mark Ellis, Becky Hammon, Brock Lesnar, Chad Greenway, and Adam Vinatieri. Mills is from the town of Pine Ridge and competed at the 1964 Summer Olympic Games in Tokyo, becoming the only American to win a gold medal in the 10,000-meter event. Miller, of Mitchell, is a two-time NBA champion who played college basketball at the University of Florida, leading them to the 2000 NCAA Championship game his sophomore year, and won the 2001 NBA rookie of the year award. Ellis, of Rapid City, played for the University of Florida and four MLB teams before retiring in 2015. Hammon, of Rapid City, played for the WNBA's New York Liberty and San Antonio Silver Stars before becoming an assistant coach for the NBA's San Antonio Spurs in 2014. Lesnar, of Webster, is a former heavy-weight champion in the UFC and WWE. Vinatieri is an NFL placekicker who grew up in Rapid City and attended SDSU.

=== Recreation ===
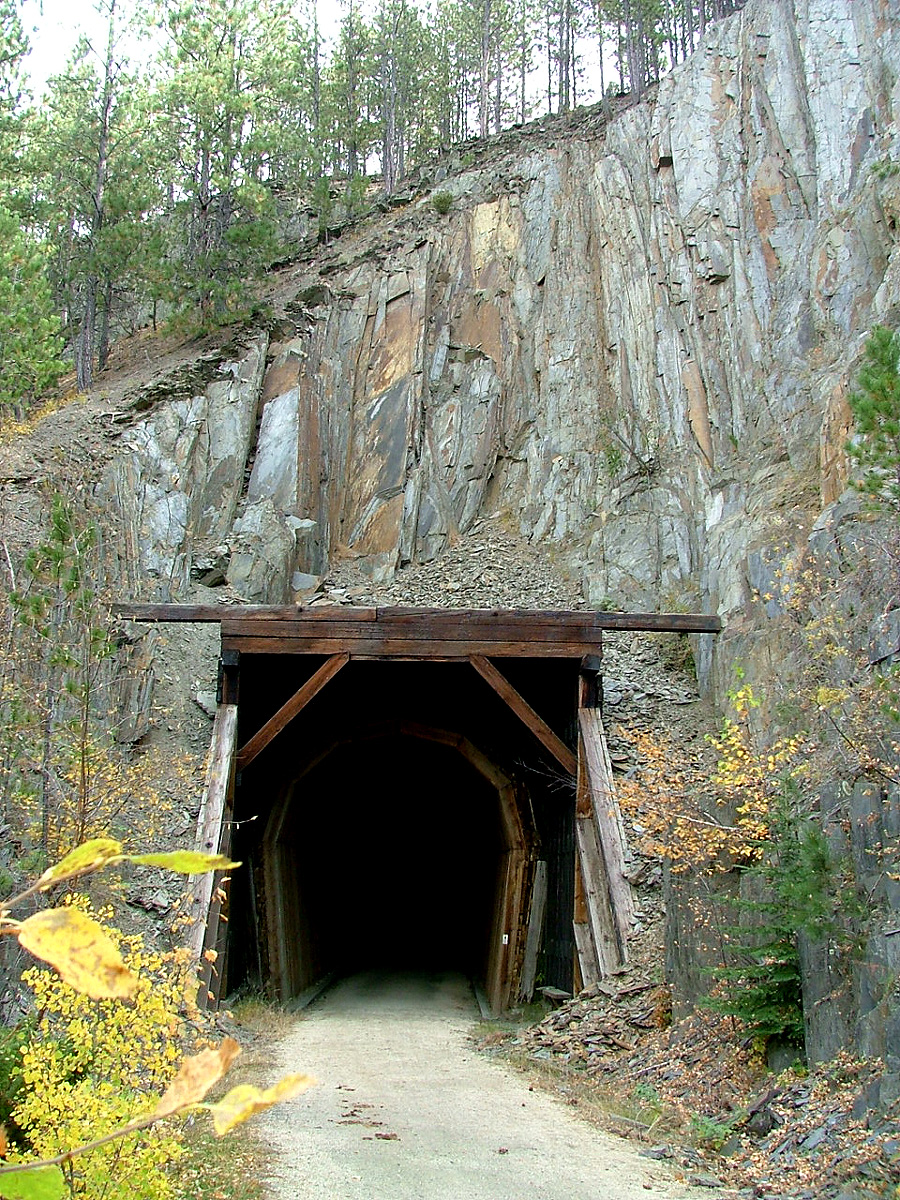
A tunnel along the George S. Mickelson Trail in the Black Hills

Fishing and hunting are popular outdoor activities in South Dakota. Fishing contributes over $224 million to South Dakota's economy, and hunting contributes over $303 million. In 2007, over 275,000 hunting licenses and 175,000 fishing licenses were sold in the state; around half of the hunting licenses and over two-thirds of the fishing licenses were purchased by South Dakotans. Popular species of game include pheasants, white-tailed deer, mule deer, and turkeys, as well as waterfowl such as Canada geese, snow geese, and mallards. Targets of anglers include walleye in the eastern glacial lakes and Missouri River reservoirs, Chinook salmon in Lake Oahe, and trout in the Black Hills.

Other sports, such as cycling and running, are also popular in the state. In 1991, the state opened the George S. Mickelson Trail, a 109-mile (175 km) rail trail in the Black Hills. Besides being used by cyclists, the trail is also the site of a portion of the annual Mount Rushmore marathon; the marathon's entire course is at an elevation of over 4,000 feet (1,200 m). Other events in the state include the Tour de Kota, a 478-mile (769 km), six-day cycling event that covers much of eastern and central South Dakota, and the annual Sturgis Motorcycle Rally, which draws hundreds of thousands of participants from around the United States.

== State symbols ==
Some of South Dakota's official state symbols include:

State bird: Ring-necked pheasant
State flower: American pasque flower
State tree: Black Hills spruce
State nicknames: Mount Rushmore State (official), Coyote state and Sunshine state (both unofficial)
State motto: "Under God, the people rule"
State slogan: "Great Faces. Great Places."
State mineral: Rose quartz
State insect: Honey bee (Apis mellifera)
State animal: Coyote
State fish: Walleye
State gemstone: Fairburn agate
State song: "Hail, South Dakota!"

== See also ==
- Index of South Dakota-related articles
- Outline of South Dakota

== Notes ==
Preceded by North Dakota	List of U.S. states by date of statehood Admitted on November 2, 1889 (40th)	Succeeded by Montana
