= Essential oil =

Hydrophobic liquid containing volatile aroma compounds from plants

Essential oils, volatile oils, ethereal oils or aetheroleum are types of oils composed of hydrophobic volatile organic compounds, usually in liquid form, obtained from plant material, such as oil of clove from clove. An essential oil is "essential" in the sense that the oil contains the fragrance or "essence" of that plant. The term "essential" used here does not indicate that it is nutritionally required in the diet, as with essential amino acid or essential fatty acid. A natural component of plant rinds, leaves, or bark, essential oils are fragrant if the plant is crushed or industrially extracted using a steam process.

Essential oils have diverse chemical properties and uses, such as inhalation for aromatherapy or application on skin when diluted for massage. They may be used to lessen pain or exert a cough-suppressing effect.

Many essential oils, particularly tea tree oil, may cause contact dermatitis. Improper use of essential oils may cause harm, including allergic reactions or other adverse effects if ingested, particularly by children.

== Production ==
Essential oils, according to ISO, are produced by steam distillation, by mechanical manipulation of the rind of the fruits of the genus Citrus (also called cold pressing), and by a variety of solvent extraction techniques. An estimated 100,000 tons of essential oils are produced annually (2015).

=== Production quantities ===
Estimates of total production of essential oils are difficult to obtain. One estimate, compiled from data in 1989, 1990, and 1994 from various sources, gives the following total production, in tonnes, of essential oils for which more than 1,000 tonnes were produced.

| Oil | Tonnes |
|---|---|
| Sweet orange | 12,000 |
| Mentha arvensis | 4,800 |
| Peppermint | 3,200 |
| Cedarwood | 2,600 |
| Lemon | 2,300 |
| Eucalyptus globulus | 2,070 |
| Litsea cubeba | 2,000 |
| Clove (leaf) | 2,000 |
| Spearmint | 1,300 |

== Uses ==
=== As pesticides ===
Some essential oils have potential as a natural pesticide. In case studies, certain oils have been shown to have a variety of deterring effects on pests, specifically insects and select arthropods. These effects may include repelling, inhibiting digestion, stunting growth, decreasing rate of reproduction, or death of pests that consume the oil. However, the molecules within the oils that cause these effects are normally non-toxic for mammals. These specific actions of the molecules allow for widespread use of these "green" pesticides without harmful effects to anything else other than pests. Essential oils that have been investigated include rose, lemon grass, lavender, thyme, peppermint, basil, cedarwood, and eucalyptus.

Although they may not be the perfect replacement for all synthetic pesticides, essential oils have prospects for crop or indoor plant protection, urban pest control, and marketed insect repellents, such as bug spray. Certain essential oils have been shown in studies to be comparable, if not exceeding, in effectiveness to DEET, which is currently marketed as the most effective mosquito repellent. Although essential oils are effective as pesticides when first applied in uses such as mosquito repellent applied to the skin, it is only effective in the vapor stage. Since this stage is relatively short-lived, creams and polymer mixtures are used in order to elongate the vapor period of effective repellency.

In any form, using essential oils as green pesticides rather than synthetic pesticides has ecological benefits such as decreased residual actions. In addition, increased use of essential oils as pest control could have not only ecological, but economical benefits as the essential oil market diversifies and popularity increases among organic farmers and environmentally conscious consumers. As of 2012 some EOs are authorized, and in use, in the European Union: Melaleuca oil as a fungicide, citronella oil as a herbicide, Syzygium aromaticum oil as a fungicide and bactericide, Mentha spicata oil as a plant growth regulator; Citrus sinensis oil (only in France) for Bemisia tabaci on Cucurbita pepo and Trialeurodes vaporariorum on Solanum lycopersicum; and approvals for oils of Thymus, C. sinensis, and Tagetes as insecticides are pending.

=== In food ===
In relation with their food applications, although these oils have been used throughout history as food preservatives, it was in the 20th century when essential oils were considered as Generally Recognized as Safe (GRAS) by the United States' Food and Drug Administration (FDA).

GRAS substances according to the FDA

| Common name | Botanical name of plant source |
|---|---|
| Alfalfa | Medicago sativa L. |
| Allspice | Pimenta officinalis Lindl. |
| Bitter almond, free from cyanide | Prunus amygdalus Batsch, Prunus armeniaca L., or Prunus persica (L.) Batsch. |
| Ambrette (seed) | Hibiscus moschatus Moench. |
| Angelica root | Angelica archangelica L. |
| Angelica seed | Angelica archangelica L. |
| Angelica stem | Angelica archangelica L. |
| Angostura (cusparia bark) | Galipea officinalis Hancock, Angostura trifoliata |
| Anise | Pimpinella anisum L. |
| Asafetida | Ferula assa-foetida L. and related spp. of Ferula |
| Balm (lemon balm) | Melissa officinalis L. |
| Balsam of Peru | Myroxylon pereirae Klotzsch. |
| Basil | Ocimum basilicum L. |
| Bay leaves | Laurus nobilis L. |
| Bay (myrcia oil) | Pimenta racemosa (Mill.) J. W. Moore. |
| Bergamot (bergamot orange) | Citrus aurantium L. subsp. bergamia Wright et Arn. |
| Bitter almond (free from prussic acid) | Prunus amygdalus Batsch, Prunus armeniaca L., or Prunus persica (L.) Batsch. |
| Bois de rose | Aniba rosaeodora Ducke. |
| Cacao | Theobroma cacao L. |
| Camomile (chamomile) flowers, German or Hungarian | Matricaria chamomilla L. |
| Camomile (chamomile) flowers, Roman or English | Anthemis nobilis L. |
| Cananga | Cananga odorata Hook. f. and Thoms. |
| Capsicum | Capsicum frutescens L. and Capsicum annuum L. |
| Caraway | Carum carvi L. |
| Cardamom seed (cardamon) | Elettaria cardamomum Maton. |
| Carob bean | Ceratonia siliqua L. |
| Carrot | Daucus carota L. |
| Cascarilla bark | Croton eluteria Benn. |
| Cassia bark, Chinese | Cinnamomum cassia Blume. |
| Cassia bark, Padang or Batavia | Cinnamomum burmanni Blume. |
| Cassia bark, Saigon | Cinnamomum loureirii Nees. |
| Celery seed | Apium graveolens L. |
| Cherry, wild, bark | Prunus serotina Ehrh. |
| Chervil | Anthriscus cerefolium (L.) Hoffm. |
| Chicory | Cichorium intybus L. |
| Cinnamon bark, Ceylon | Cinnamomum zeylanicum Nees. |
| Cinnamon bark, Chinese | Cinnamomum cassia Blume. |
| Cinnamon bark, Saigon | Cinnamomum loureirii Nees. |
| Cinnamon leaf, Ceylon | Cinnamomum zeylanicum Nees. |
| Cinnamon leaf, Chinese | Cinnamomum cassia Blume. |
| Cinnamon leaf, Saigon | Cinnamomum loureirii Nees. |
| Citronella | Cymbopogon nardus Rendle. |
| Citrus peels | Citrus spp. |
| Clary (clary sage) | Salvia sclarea L. |
| Clover | Trifolium spp. |
| Coca (decocainized) | Erythroxylum coca Lam. and other spp. of Erythroxylum |
| Coffee | Coffea spp. |
| Cola nut | Cola acuminata Schott and Endl., and other spp. of Cola |
| Coriander | Coriandrum sativum L. |
| Cumin (cummin) | Cuminum cyminum L. |
| Curaçao orange peel (orange, bitter peel) | Citrus aurantium L. |
| Cusparia bark | Galipea officinalis Hancock |
| Dandelion | Taraxacum officinale Weber and Taraxacum laevigatum DC. |
| Dandelion root | Taraxacum officinale Weber and Taraxacum laevigatum DC. |
| Dog grass (quackgrass, triticum) | Agropyron repens (L.) Beauv. |
| Elder flowers | Sambucus canadensis L. and Sambucus nigra I. |
| Estragole (esdragol, esdragon, tarragon) | Artemisia dracunculus L. |
| Estragon (tarragon) | Artemisia dracunculus L. |
| Fennel, sweet | Foeniculum vulgare Mill. |
| Fenugreek | Trigonella foenum-graecum L. |
| Galanga (galangal) | Alpinia officinarum Hance. |
| Geranium | Pelargonium spp. |
| Geranium, East Indian | Cymbopogon martini Stapf. |
| Geranium, rose | Pelargonium graveolens L'Her. |
| Ginger | Zingiber officinale Rosc. |
| Grapefruit | Citrus paradisi Macf. |
| Guava | Psidium spp. |
| Hickory bark | Carya spp. |
| Horehound (hoarhound) | Marrubium vulgare L. |
| Hops | Humulus lupulus L. |
| Horsemint | Monarda punctata L. |
| Hyssop | Hyssopus officinalis L. |
| Immortelle | Helichrysum augustifolium DC. |
| Jasmine | Jasminum officinale L. and other spp. of Jasminum |
| Juniper (berries) | Juniperus communis L. |
| Kola nut | Cola acuminata Schott and Endl., and other spp. of Cola |
| Laurel berries | Laurus nobilis L. |
| Laurel leaves | Laurus spp. |
| Lavender | Lavandula officinalis Chaix |
| Lavender, spike | Lavandula latifolia Vill. |
| Lavandin | Hybrids between Lavandula officinalis Chaix and Lavandula latifolin Vill. |
| Lemon | Citrus limon (L.) Burm. f. |
| Lemon balm (see balm) | Melissa officinalis L. |
| Lemongrass | Cymbopogon citratus DC. and Cymbopogon lexuosus Stapf. |
| Lemon peel | Citrus limon (L.) Burm. f. |
| Lime | Citrus aurantifolia Swingle. |
| Linden flowers | Tilia spp. |
| Locust bean | Ceratonia siliqua L, |
| Lupulin | Humulus lupulus L. |
| Mace | Myristica fragrans Houtt. |
| Mandarin | Citrus reticulata Blanco. |
| Marjoram, sweet | Majorana hortensis Moench. |
| Mate, yerba | Ilex paraguariensis St. Hil. |
| Melissa (see balm) | |
| Menthol | Mentha spp. |
| Menthyl acetate | Mentha spp. |
| Molasses (extract) | Saccharum officinarum L. |
| Mustard | Brassica spp. |
| Naringin | Citrus paradisi Macf. |
| Neroli, bigarade | Citrus aurantium L. |
| Nutmeg | Myristica fragrans Houtt. |
| Onion | Allium cepa L. |
| Orange, bitter, flowers | Citrus aurantium L. |
| Orange, bitter, peel | Citrus aurantium L. |
| Orange leaf | Citrus sinensis (L.) Osbeck. |
| Orange, sweet | Citrus sinensis (L.) Osbeck. |
| Orange, sweet, flowers | Citrus sinensis (L.) Osbeck. |
| Orange, sweet, peel | Citrus sinensis (L.) Osbeck. |
| Origanum | Origanum spp. |
| Palmarosa | Cymbopogon martini Stapf. |
| Paprika | Capsicum annuum L. |
| Parsley | Petroselinum crispum (Mill.) Mansf. |
| Pepper, black | Piper nigrum L. |
| Pepper, white | Piper nigrum L. |
| Peppermint | Mentha piperita L. |
| Peruvian balsam | Myroxylon pereirae Klotzsch. |
| Petitgrain | Citrus aurantium L. |
| Petitgrain lemon | Citrus limon (L.) Burm. f. |
| Petitgrain mandarin or tangerine | Citrus reticulata Blanco. |
| Pimenta | Pimenta officinalis Lindl. |
| Pimenta leaf | Pimenta officinalis Lindl. |
| Pipsissewa leaves | Chimaphila umbellata Nutt. |
| Pomegranate | Punica granatum L. |
| Prickly ash bark | Xanthoxylum (or Zanthoxylum) americanum Mill. or Xanthoxylum clava-herculis L. |
| Rose absolute | Rosa alba L., Rosa centifolia L., Rosa damascena Mill., Rosa gallica L., and vars. of these spp. |
| Rose (otto of roses, attar of roses) | Rosa alba L., Rosa centifolia L., Rosa damascena Mill., Rosa gallica L., and vars. of these spp. |
| Rose buds | Rosa alba L., Rosa centifolia L., Rosa damascena Mill., Rosa gallica L., and vars. of these spp. |
| Rose flowers | Rosa alba L., Rosa centifolia L., Rosa damascena Mill., Rosa gallica L., and vars. of these spp. |
| Rose fruit (hips) | Rosa alba L., Rosa centifolia L., Rosa damascena Mill., Rosa gallica L., and vars. of these spp. |
| Rose geranium | Pelargonium graveolens L'Her. |
| Rose leaves | Rosa spp. |
| Rosemary | Rosmarinus officinalis L. |
| Saffron | Crocus sativus L. |
| Sage | Salvia officinalis L. |
| Sage, Greek | Salvia triloba L. |
| Sage, Spanish | Salvia officinalis subsp. lavandulifolia (Vahl) Gams |
| Savory, summer | Satureia hortensis L. |
| Savory, winter | Satureia montana L. |
| Schinus molle | Schinus molle L. |
| Sloe berries (blackthorn berries) | Prunus spinosa L. |
| Spearmint | Mentha spicata L. |
| Spike lavender | Lavandula latifolia Vill. |
| Tamarind | Tamarindus indica L. |
| Tangerine | Citrus reticulata Blanco. |
| Tarragon | Artemisia dracunculus L. |
| Tea | Thea sinensis L. |
| Thyme | Thymus vulgaris L. and Thymus zygis var. gracilis Boiss. |
| Thyme, white | Thymus vulgaris L. and Thymus zygis var. gracilis Boiss. |
| Thyme, wild or creeping | Thymus serpyllum L. |
| Triticum (see dog grass) | Elymus repens |
| Tuberose | Polianthes tuberosa L. |
| Turmeric | Curcuma longa L. |
| Vanilla | Vanilla planifolia Andr. or Vanilla tahitensis J. W. Moore. |
| Violet flowers | Viola odorata L. |
| Violet leaves | Viola odorata L. |
| Violet leaves absolute | Viola odorata L. |
| Wild cherry bark | Prunus serotina Ehrh. |
| Ylang-ylang | Cananga odorata Hook. f. and Thoms. |
| Zedoary bark | Curcuma zedoaria Rosc. |

=== As antimicrobials ===
The most commonly used essential oils with antimicrobial action are: phenol-rich EOs such as Thymus spp. Origanum spp., Satureja spp., phenylpropene-rich EOs such as Cinnamomum verum cortex and leaves, Syzygium aromaticum, and alcohol-rich EOs such as Melaleuca alternifolia, Lavandula x intermedia, Lavandula angustifolia, Pelargonium spp., etc.: important antimicrobial compounds are eugenol, eugenol acetate, carvacrol, linalool, thymol, geraniol, cinnamaldehyde, geranial, neral, 1,8-cineole, methyl chavicol, methyl cinnamate, methyl eugenol, camphor, α-thujone, (Z)-linalool oxide.

Some essential oils are effective antimicrobials and have been evaluated for food incorporation in vitro. However, actual deployment is rare because much higher concentrations are required in real foods. Some or all of this lower effectiveness is due to large differences between culture medium and foods in chemistry (especially lipid content), viscosity, and duration of inoculation/storage.

=== As aromatherapy ===
Essential oils are used in aromatherapy for relaxation, particularly by people having nausea and pain caused by cancer and chemotherapy. Using essential oils for aromatherapy may give symptom relief from end of life conditions, anxiety, depression, stress or insomnia, and for hospital or home settings in critical care or palliative care.

== Raw materials ==
Essential oils are derived from sections of plants. Some plants, like the bitter orange, are sources of several types of essential oil.

| Bark: Cassia; Cinnamon; Sassafras; Berries: Allspice; Juniper; Flowers: Cannabis; Chamomile; Clary sage; Clove; Hops; Hyssop; Jasmine; Lavender; Manuka; Marjoram; Orange; Pelargonium (Scented geranium); Plumeria; Rose; Ylang-ylang | Leaves: Basil; Bay leaf; Buchu; Cinnamon; Common sage; Eucalyptus; Guava; Lemon grass; Melaleuca; Oregano; rose; bergamot; Patchouli; Peppermint; Pine; Rosemary; Spearmint; Tea tree; Thyme; Tsuga; Wintergreen; Peel: Bergamot; Grapefruit; Lemon; Lime; Orange; Tangerine | Resin: Benzoin; Copaiba; Frankincense; Labdanum; Myrrh; Rhizome: Galangal; Ginger; Roots: Valerian; Seeds: Anise; Buchu; Celery; Cumin; Flax; Nutmeg oil; Woods: Agarwood; Camphor; Cedar; Rosewood; Sandalwood |

=== Balsam of Peru ===
Balsam of Peru, an essential oil derived from Myroxylon plants, is used in food and drink for flavoring, in perfumes and toiletries for fragrance, and in animal care products. However, national and international surveys identified balsam of Peru among the "top five" allergens most commonly causing patch test allergic reactions in people referred to dermatology clinics.

=== Garlic oil ===
Garlic oil is an essential oil derived from garlic.

=== Eucalyptus oil ===
Most eucalyptus oil on the market is produced from the leaves of Eucalyptus globulus. Steam-distilled eucalyptus oil is used throughout Asia, Africa, Latin America and South America as a primary cleaning/disinfecting agent added to soaped mop and countertop cleaning solutions; it also possesses insect and limited vermin control properties. There are, however, hundreds of species of eucalyptus, and perhaps some dozens are used to various extents as sources of essential oils.

=== Lavender oil ===
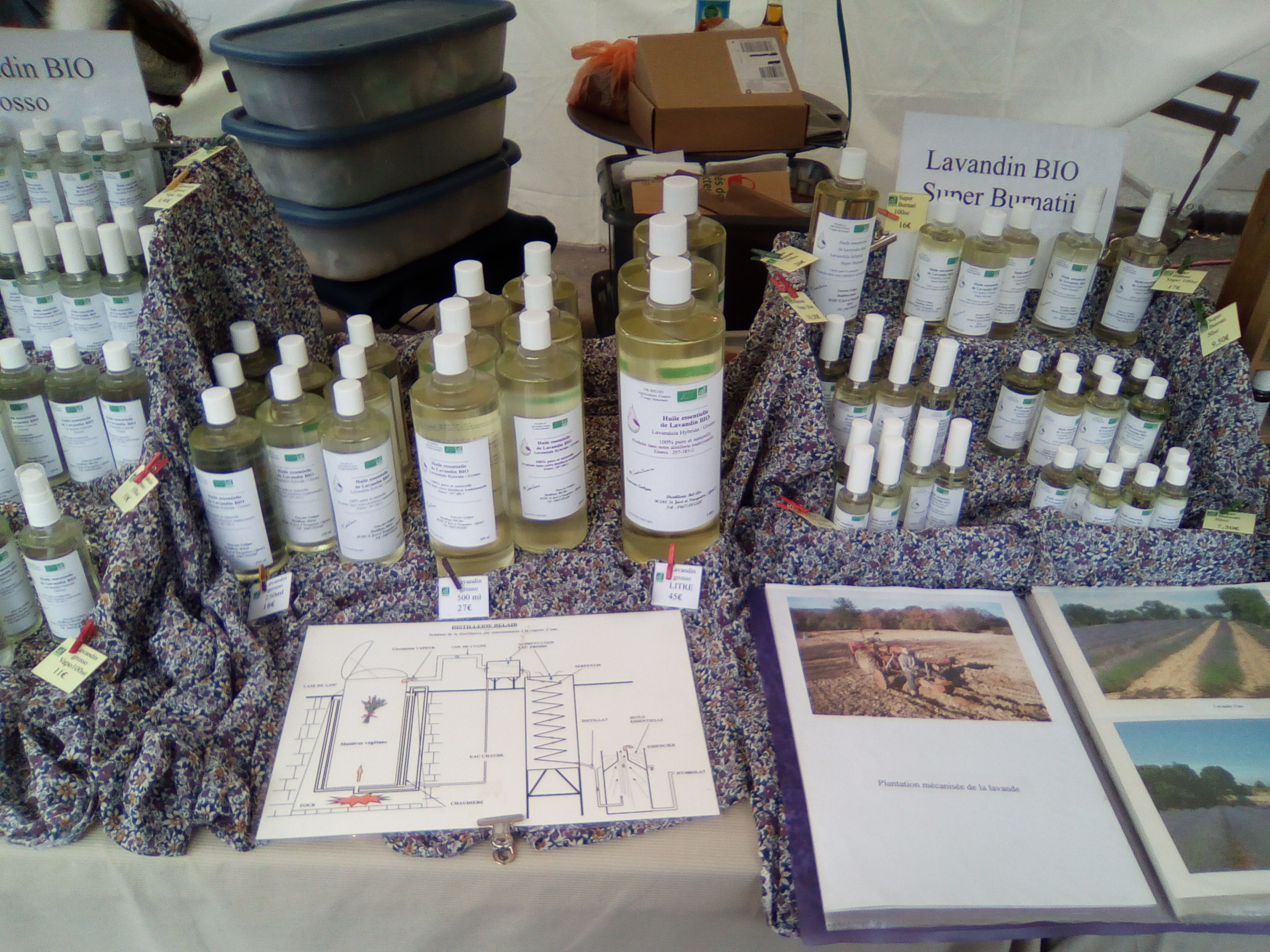
Lavender essential oil sold at a market in France

Lavender oil has long been used in the production of perfume. However, studies have shown it can be estrogenic and antiandrogenic, causing problems for prepubescent boys and pregnant women, in particular. Lavender essential oil is also used as an insect repellent.

=== Rose oil ===
There are two major species of rose whose petals used for the production of Rose oil; Rosa damascena and Rosa centifolia. Rose oils can be classified according to their botanical name, their place of origin and their extraction process. Steam-distilled rose oil is known as "rose otto", while the solvent extracted oil is known as "rose absolute". Rose otto is extracted through hydro-distillation, in which Rosa damascena petals are slowly heated with water. The heat causes the petals to release the essential rose oil. When cooled, the oil (rose otto) floats to the surface of the water (rose hydrosol). In contrast, rose absolute is solvent-extracted. Rose petals are combined with an organic solvent in a slowly rotating drum to draw out the aromatic matter from the flowers. After the solvent is evaporated, the waxy substance remaining is called rose concrete. Rose concrete is filtered with ethanol alcohol to remove waxes and non-aromatic components and leave behind the liquid known as rose absolute.

== Toxicity ==
The potential toxicity of essential oil is related to the toxicity of specific chemical components of the oil, and to its level or grade of purity. Industrial users of essential oils should consult the safety data sheets to determine the hazards and handling requirements of particular oils.

Some essential oils, even at extremely low levels, can pose health threats for pregnant women, those who are breastfeeding, those with estrogen-dependent cancers or individuals with epilepsy. Essential oil use in children can pose a danger when misused because of their thin skin and developing livers. This might cause them to be more susceptible to toxic effects than adults.

Some essential oils can cause severe irritation, provoke an allergic reaction and, over time, prove toxic to the liver. If ingested or rubbed into the skin, essential oils can be toxic, causing confusion, choking, loss of muscle coordination, difficulty in breathing, pneumonia, seizures, and possibly severe allergic reactions or coma.

Some essential oils, including many of the citrus peel oils, are photosensitizers, increasing vulnerability of the skin to sunlight.

=== Flammability ===
The flash point of each essential oil is different. Many of the common essential oils, such as tea tree, lavender, and citrus oils, are classed as Class 3 Flammable Liquids, as they have a flash points at or below 60 °C.

=== Handling ===
Exposure to essential oils may cause contact dermatitis. Essential oils can be aggressive toward rubbers and plastics, so care must be taken in choosing the correct handling equipment. Glass syringes are often used, but have coarse volumetric graduations. Chemistry syringes are ideal, as they resist essential oils, are long enough to enter deep vessels, and have fine graduations, facilitating quality control. Unlike traditional pipettes, which have difficulty handling viscous fluids, the chemistry syringe, also known as a positive displacement pipette, has a seal and piston arrangement which slides inside the pipette, wiping the essential oil off the pipette wall.

=== Ingestion ===
Some essential oils qualify as GRAS flavoring agents for use in foods, beverages, and confectioneries according to strict good manufacturing practice and flavorist standards. Pharmacopoeia standards for medicinal oils should be heeded.

The internal use of essential oils can pose hazards to pregnant women, as some can be abortifacients or cause fetal damage, and thus should not be used during pregnancy. Some oils can be toxic to some domestic animals, cats in particular.

Essential oils can be toxic if ingested or absorbed through the skin.

=== Pregnancy ===
Some essential oils should not be used by pregnant or breastfeeding women, because they can be abortifacients, cause fetal damage, or disrupt hormones. Key components of essential oils and whole essential oils do not always have the same hormonal effects. Minor compounds in whole oils may have both individual or group (synergistic) effects.

Some essential oils may contain impurities or additives that may be harmful. Some uses of essential oils may be safe during pregnancy (e.g. smelling lavender to reduce stress), but care must be taken when selecting quality and brand.

Sensitivity to certain smells may cause pregnant women to have adverse side effects with essential oil use, such as headache, vertigo, and nausea. Pregnant women often report a heightened sensitivity to smells and taste, and essential oils can cause irritation and nausea if ingested.

=== Toxicology ===
The following table lists the LD_{50} or median lethal dose for common oils; this is the dose required to kill half the members of a tested animal population. LD_{50} is intended as a guideline only, and reported values can vary widely due to differences in tested species and testing conditions.

| Common name | Oral LD_{50} | Dermal LD_{50} | Notes |
|---|---|---|---|
| Neem | 14 mg/kg | >2 mg/kg | |
| Lemon myrtle | 2.43 mg/kg | 2.25 mg/kg | |
| Frankincense | >5 mg/kg | >5 mg/kg | Boswellia carterii |
| Frankincense | >2 mg/kg | >2 mg/kg | Boswellia sacra |
| Indian frankincense | >2 mg/kg | >2 mg/kg | Boswellia serrata |
| Ylang-ylang | >5 mg/kg | >5 mg/kg | |
| Cedarwood | >5 mg/kg | >5 mg/kg | |
| Roman chamomile | >5 mg/kg | >5 mg/kg | |
| White camphor | >5 mg/kg | >5 mg/kg | Cinnamomum camphora, extracted from leaves |
| Yellow camphor | 3.73 mg/kg | >5 mg/kg | Cinnamomum camphora, extracted from bark |
| Hot oil | 3.80 mg/kg | >5 mg/kg | Cinnamomum camphora, oil extracted from leaves |
| Cassia | 2.80 mg/kg | 0.32 mg/kg | |

== Further cautions ==
In Australia, essential oils (mainly eucalyptus) have caused cases of poisoning, mostly of children.

== Standardization of derived products ==
In 2002, ISO published ISO 4720 in which the botanical names of the relevant plants are standardized. The rest of the standards with regards to this topic can be found in the section of ICS 71.100.60.

== History ==
The resins of aromatics and plant extracts were retained to produce traditional medicines and scented preparations, such as perfumes and incense, including frankincense, myrrh, cedarwood, juniper berry and cinnamon. Essential oils have been used in folk medicine over centuries. The Persian physician Ibn Sina, known as Avicenna in Europe, was first to derive the fragrance of flowers from distillation, while the earliest recorded mention of the techniques and methods used to produce essential oils may be Ibn al-Baitar (1188–1248), an Arab Al-Andalusian (Muslim Spain) physician, pharmacist and chemist.

Rather than refer to essential oils themselves, modern works typically discuss specific chemical compounds of which the essential oils are composed, such as referring to methyl salicylate rather than "oil of wintergreen".

== See also ==
- Aromatherapy
- Aroma lamp
- Enfleurage
- Fragrance oil
- List of essential oils
- PiHKAL § Essential amphetamines
- Tincture
- Volatility
