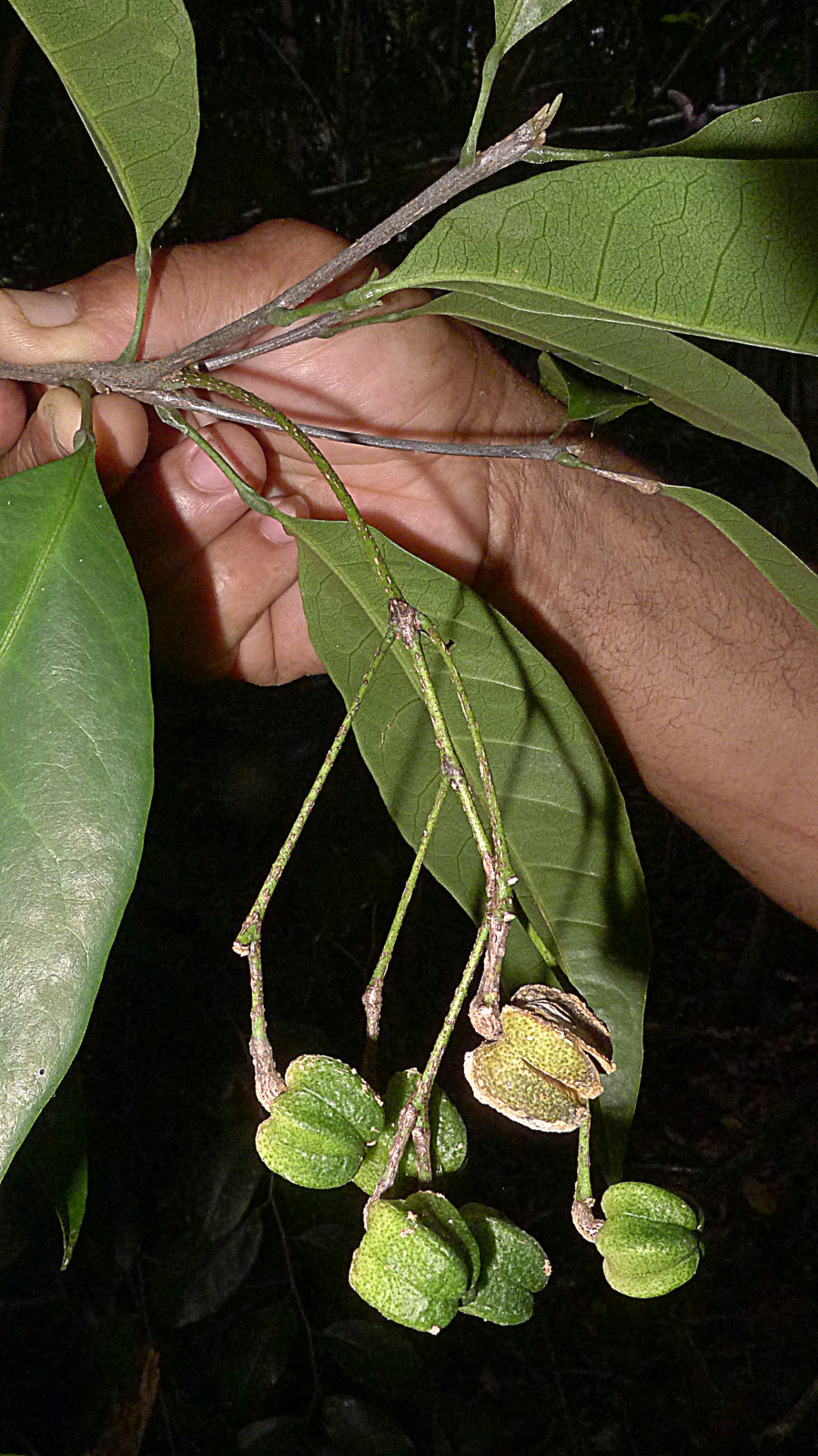
- Unidentified species of Galipea in Brazil

Scientific classification
- Kingdom: Plantae
- Clade: Tracheophytes
- Clade: Angiosperms
- Clade: Eudicots
- Clade: Rosids
- Order: Sapindales
- Family: Rutaceae
- Subfamily: Zanthoxyloideae
- Genus: Galipea; Aubl.

Species
- 14, see text

Synonyms
- Costa Vell.; Endostephium Turcz.

= Galipea =

Genus of flowering plants

Galipea is a genus of flowering plants in the family Rutaceae. It includes 14 species native to tropical Central and South America.

== Species ==
14 species are accepted.

- Galipea carinata Pirani
- Galipea ciliata Taub.
- Galipea congestiflora Pirani
- Galipea dasysperma Gómez-Laur. & Q.Jiménez
- Galipea davisii Sandwith
- Galipea grandifolia Engl.
- Galipea jasminiflora (A.St.-Hil.) Engl.
- Galipea laxiflora Engl.
- Galipea maxima Pirani & Kallunki
- Galipea panamensis T.S.Elias
- Galipea ramiflora Pirani
- Galipea revoluta Pirani
- Galipea simplicifolia Schult.
- Galipea trifoliata Aubl.

=== Formerly placed here ===
- Angostura granulosa (Kallunki) Kallunki (as Galipea granulosa Kallunki)
- Angostura longiflora (K.Krause) Kallunki (as Galipea longiflora K.Krause)
- †Angostura ossana (as Galipea ossana)
- Angostura trifoliata (as Galipea officinalis)
- Conchocarpus elegans (as Galipea elegans)
