= Geography of South Dakota =

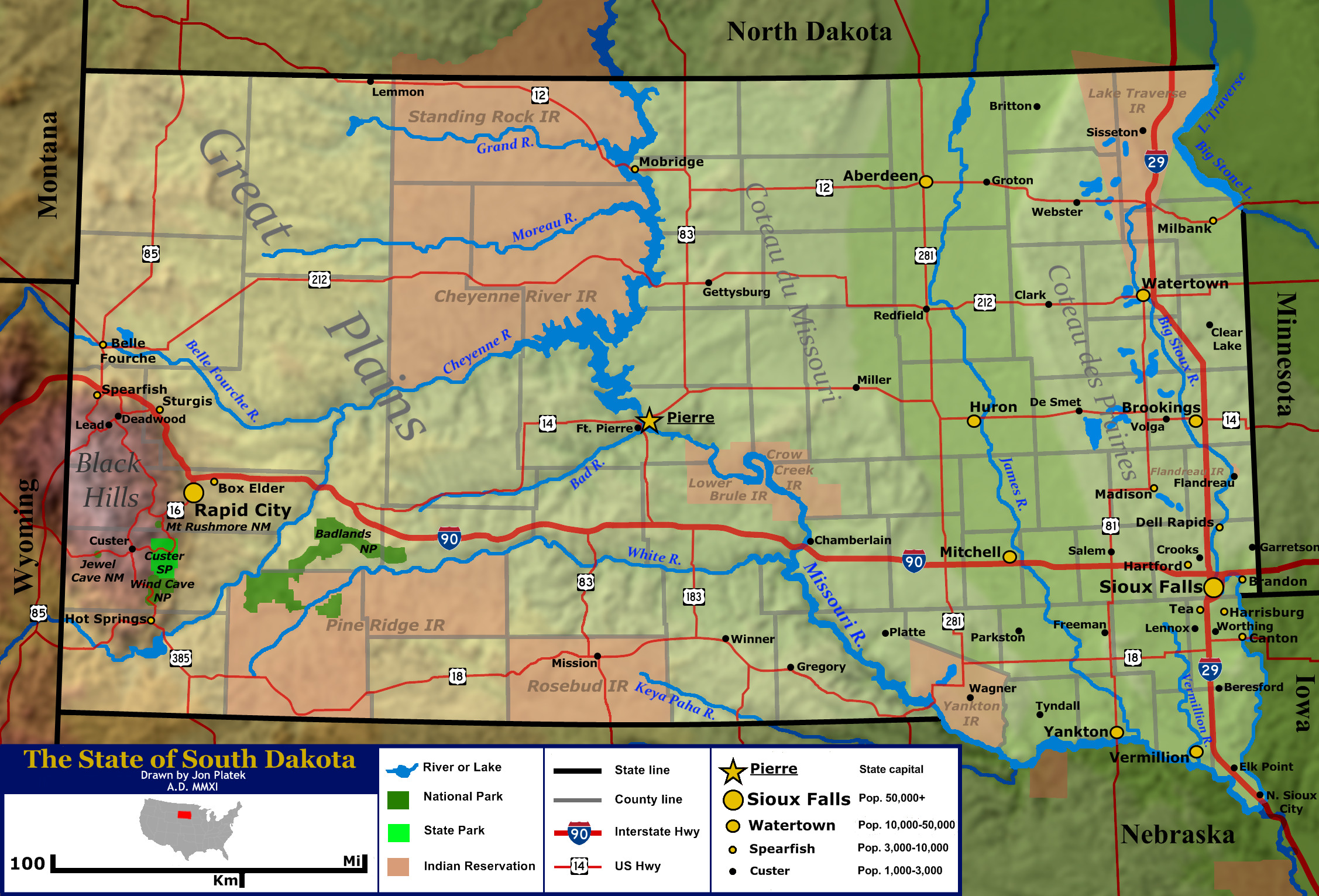
Terrain and primary geographic features of South Dakota

South Dakota is a state located in the north-central United States. It is usually considered to be in the Midwestern region of the country. The state can generally be divided into three geographic regions: eastern South Dakota, western South Dakota, and the Black Hills. Eastern South Dakota is lower in elevation and higher in precipitation than the western part of the state, and the Black Hills are a low, isolated mountain group in the southwestern corner of the state. Smaller sub-regions in the state include the Coteau des Prairies, Missouri Coteau, James River Valley, and the Dissected Till Plains. Geologic formations in South Dakota range in age from two billion-year-old Precambrian granite in the Black Hills to glacial till deposited over the last few million years. South Dakota is the 17th-largest state in the country.

South Dakota has a humid continental climate in the east and the Black Hills, and a semi-arid climate in the west outside of the Black Hills, featuring four very distinct seasons, and the ecology of the state features plant and animal species typical of a North American temperate grassland biome. A number of areas under the protection of the federal or state government, such as Badlands National Park, Wind Cave National Park, and Custer State Park, are located in the state.

In 2025, the population of South Dakota was estimated to be 924,669, and the state ranks fifth-lowest in both total population as well as population density in the United States. Sioux Falls, with a population of just over 200,000 is the largest city in the state. Rapid City ranks as South Dakota's second-largest city, and Pierre is the state capital. Historically a very agricultural state, the service and tourism sectors have grown in economic importance in recent years.

== Location and size ==
Location of South Dakota in the United States

South Dakota is situated in the north-central United States, and is considered to be a part of the Midwest by the U.S. Census Bureau, although the Great Plains region also covers the state. Additionally, the culture, economy, and geography of western South Dakota has more in common with the West than the Midwest. The state has a total land area of 77,116 sq. miles (199,905 km^{2}), making it the 17th largest in the Union.

South Dakota is bordered to the north by North Dakota; to the south by Nebraska; to the east by Iowa and Minnesota; and to the west by Wyoming and Montana. The western border is the Black Hills meridian, a north-south line set out at a certain distance from Washington, D.C., to separate South Dakota from Montana and Wyoming during the transition to statehood. The northern border is the 46th parallel north and was originally marked by 720 quartzite monuments over 360 miles (580 km) of prairie.

Two time zones cover South Dakota; the state is split roughly in half between the Central Time Zone (UTC-6) in the east and the Mountain Time Zone (UTC-7) in the west. The boundary between the two zones runs south down the Missouri River until Pierre, at which point the boundary roughly continues due south while the river turns southeast.

The North American continental pole of inaccessibility is in Bennett County, located 1024 mi (1650 km) from the nearest coastline, between Allen and Kyle (Oglala Lakota County) at 43.36°N 101.97°W.

== Regions ==
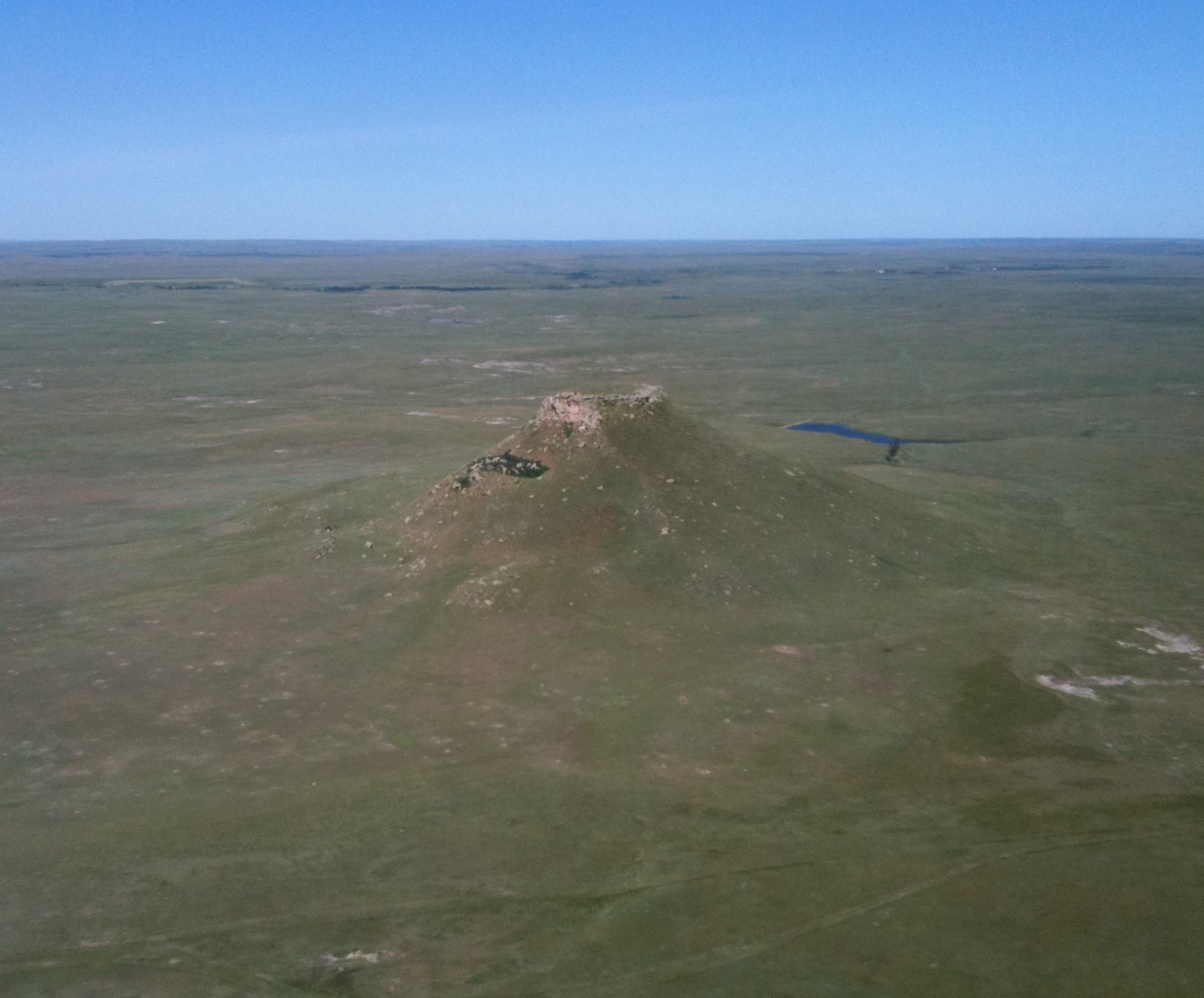
Much of western South Dakota is covered by a semi-arid grassland and features buttes such as Thunder Butte, shown above.

South Dakota can generally be divided into three regions: eastern South Dakota, western South Dakota, and the Black Hills. The Missouri River serves as a somewhat stark boundary in terms of geographic, social and political differences between eastern and western South Dakota, and the geography of the Black Hills differs from its surroundings to such an extent that it can be considered separate from the rest of western South Dakota. South Dakotans also at times combine the Black Hills with the rest of western South Dakota, and refer to the two resulting regions, divided by the Missouri, as West River and East River.

Eastern South Dakota is generally wetter and features lower topography than the western part of the state. Smaller geographic regions of this area include the Coteau des Prairies, the Dissected Till Plains, and the James River Valley. The Coteau des Prairies is a higher region bordered on the east by the Minnesota River Valley and on the west by the James River Basin. Numerous glacial lakes cover the Coteau, and it is largely drained by the Big Sioux River, a tributary of the Missouri. Further to the west, the James River Basin is mostly low, flat, highly eroded land, following the flow of the James River through South Dakota from north to south. The Dissected Till Plains, an area of rolling hills and fertile soil that covers much of Iowa and Nebraska, also extends into the southeastern corner of South Dakota.

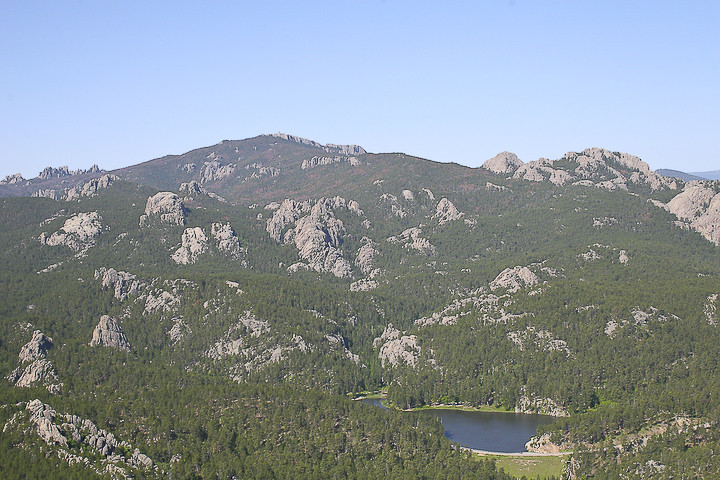
The Black Hills are a group of low mountains in the southwestern part of the state.

The Missouri Coteau lies between the James River Basin of the Drift Prairie and the Missouri River. This region is the southern section of a large plateau extending into Canada.

The Great Plains cover most of the western two-thirds of South Dakota. West of the Missouri River the landscape becomes more rugged and consists of rolling hills, plains, ravines, and steep flat-topped hills called buttes. These buttes sometimes rise 400 to 600 feet (120 to 180 m) above the plains. In the south, east of the Black Hills, lie the South Dakota Badlands.

The Black Hills are in the southwestern part of South Dakota and extend into Wyoming. This range of low mountains covers 6,000 sq. miles (15,500 km^{2}.) with mountains that rise from 2,000 to 4,000 feet (600 to 1,200 m) above their bases. The highest point in South Dakota, Black Elk Peak (formerly named Harney Peak) is 7,242 ft or 2,207 m above sea level and is in the Black Hills. This is the highest point in the United States east of the Rocky Mountains. Other Black Hills mountains that are over 7,000 ft (2,133 m) in elevation include Bear Mountain, Crooks Tower, Terry Peak, and Crows Nest Peak. The Black Hills are rich in minerals such as gold, silver, copper, and lead. The Homestake Mine, the largest and deepest gold mine in North America, was located in the Black Hills and produced over $1 billion in gold since it started operation in 1876. The mine is now a scientific laboratory.

== Geology ==
South Dakota geologic formations and deposits range in age from several billion to several thousand years, and the age of the rocks generally decreases as one moves from west to east across the state. The oldest geologic formations in the state were created over two billion years ago during the Precambrian, and consist of metamorphic and igneous rocks. These form the central core of the Black Hills, but they can also be found in two isolated locations in eastern South Dakota near Milbank and Sioux Falls. Formations from the Paleozoic Era form the outer ring of the Black Hills; these were created between roughly 540 and 250 million years ago. This area features rocks such as limestone which were deposited here when the area formed the shoreline of an ancient inland sea.

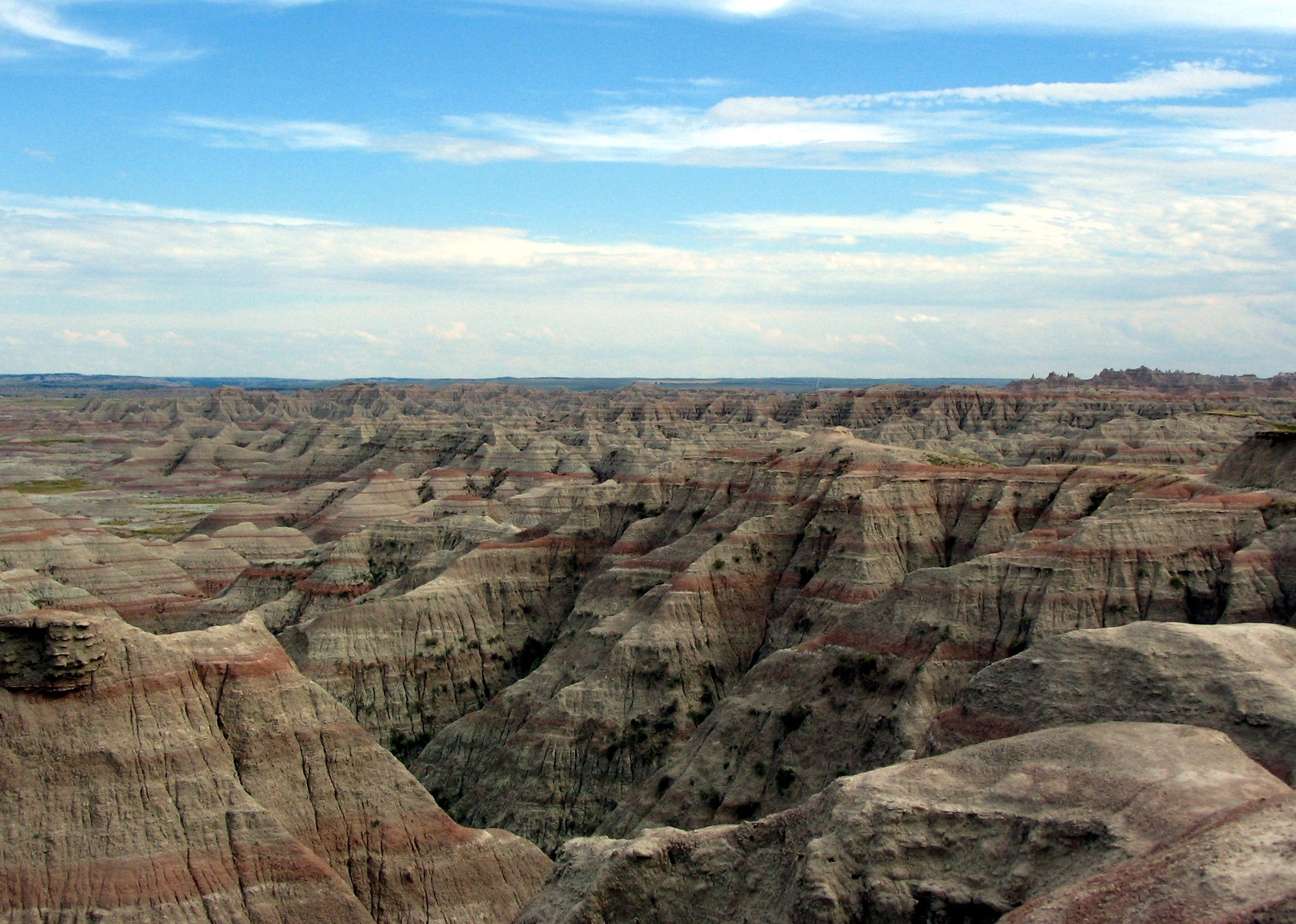
Various sedimentary rock strata are visible in many areas of Badlands National Park.

Outside of the Black Hills, much of western South Dakota features rock formed during the Mesozoic Era, from 250 million to 66 million years ago. At the time, much of western and central South Dakota was again covered by a shallow inland sea. Marine skeletons from this ocean settled to the seafloor and were compacted to form the sedimentary rocks in the area today. During this period, the Black Hills, which had been pushed up to an elevation of around 15,000 feet (4,500 m), lost around 6,000 feet (1,800 m) worth of rock layers due to erosion. Many of these sediments ended up in the same area as the marine deposits from the inland sea, and both contribute to western South Dakota's present-day geological makeup. In several areas in western South Dakota, tertiary deposits may also be found. These were formed between 66 and 2.5 million years ago from eroded mountains to the west. There is also volcanic material deposited here that presumably came from the Yellowstone area. These layers of sedimentary rock are distinctly visible in the multi-colored rocks and cliffs of Badlands National Park.

Layers deposited during the Pleistocene epoch, starting around two million years ago, cover most of eastern South Dakota. These are the youngest rock and sediment layers in the state, and are the product of several successive periods of glaciation which deposited a large amount of rocks and soil, known as till, over the area. The thickness of the glacial till layer ranges between 100 and 900 feet (30 and 270 m). This till is also what makes agriculture more prevalent in eastern South Dakota as it is extremely fertile.

Much of the human history of South Dakota was shaped by its geology. Gold seekers founded most of the larger cities around the Black Hills, and quarrying was an important economic activity in several areas in eastern South Dakota. Mines and quarries in present-day South Dakota produce gold, Sioux quartzite, Milbank granite, sand, gravel, limestone, mica, and uranium. The state also produces a very limited amount of oil and natural gas.

== Rivers and lakes ==
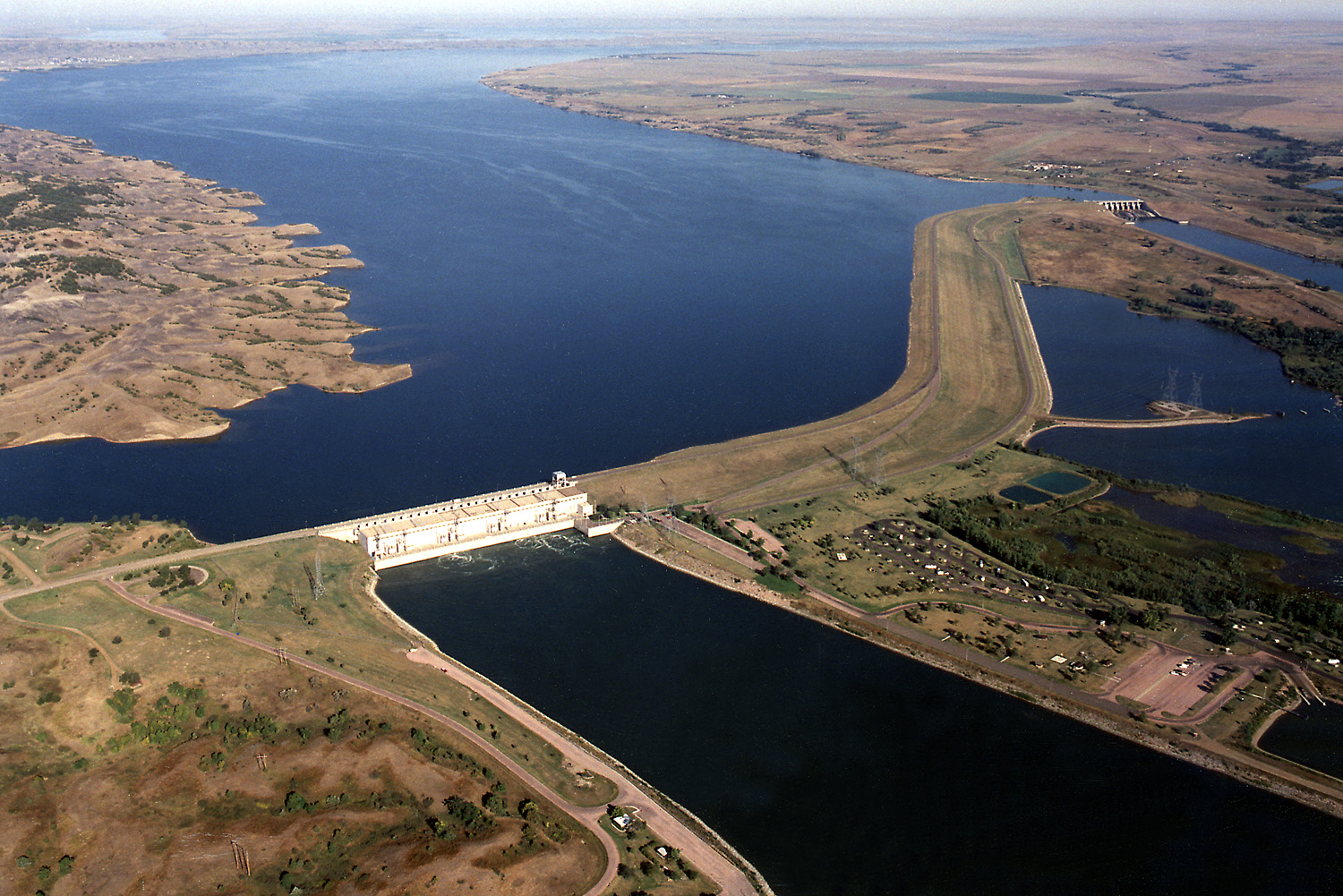
Big Bend Dam is one of four large dams on the Missouri River in South Dakota

The Missouri River is the largest and longest river in the state. Other major South Dakota rivers include the Cheyenne, the James, the Big Sioux, and the White. Essentially all of South Dakota's rivers are part of the Missouri River Valley. Dams on the Missouri River create four large reservoirs: Lake Oahe, Lake Sharpe, Lake Francis Case, and Lewis and Clark Lake. Hydroelectricity generated from power plants at the dams provides approximately half of the electricity used by South Dakotans.

The vast majority of South Dakota's natural lakes are located in the eastern half of the state, and most are the product of the most recent ice age. The title of largest natural lake is somewhat disputed; Lake Thompson is larger than Lake Poinsett, but Lake Poinsett has maintained its current size for a much longer period of time. Other major natural lakes include Lake Kampeska, Waubay Lake, Lake Madison, Lake Whitewood, and Lake Herman. Additionally, two large lakes, Big Stone Lake and Lake Traverse, form part of the border between South Dakota and Minnesota. The continental divide separating the drainage basin of Hudson Bay from that of the Gulf of Mexico is situated between these two lakes.

== Ecology ==
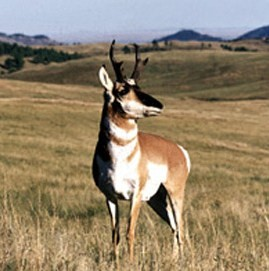
A pronghorn in Wind Cave National Park

Much of South Dakota, with the notable exception of the Black Hills, is dominated by a temperate grasslands biome. Although grasses and crops cover most of this region, deciduous trees such as cottonwoods, elms, and willows are common near rivers and in shelter belts. In open, uncultivated areas of the plains, grasses such as buffalograss, western wheatgrass, switchgrass, big bluestem and little bluestem thrive. Mammals in this area include bison, deer, pronghorn, coyotes, beavers, and prairie dogs, while reptiles include the snapping turtle, the box turtle, and various types of snakes. The prairie rattlesnake is South Dakota's only venomous snake. Rivers and lakes of the grasslands support populations of walleye, carp, pike, and bass, along with other species. The Missouri River also contains the pre-historic paddlefish, and chinook salmon, native to the Pacific Northwest, have been successfully introduced in Lake Oahe.

=== Tall grass prairies ===
With the state's highest precipitation, southeastern South Dakota once had 3-foot (0.91 m) to 6-foot (1.8 m)-tall grasses, herbs, and low shrubs. The region has plenty of groundwater and, because of common spring floods, does not have many burrowing animals. Before modern agriculture, the tall grass prairies had large numbers of big bluestem, little bluestem, Indian grass, switchgrass, sand dropseed, and other tall grasses. Flood plains along the Missouri and Big Sioux Rivers are habitat for wild rye, bluejoint, and panicgrass. The tall grass prairies have wild rose and buck bush shrubs, and goldenrod, sunflower, cinquefoil, and milkweed herbs. Marsh hawks, bobolink, short-eared owl, and short-billed marsh wren birds make their home in this prairie, and jackrabbits, cottontail rabbits, meadow mice, and deer are common animal life.

=== Mid and tall grass prairies ===
Plants in the mid and tall grass prairies grow 1 foot (0.30 m) to 3 feet (0.91 m) tall. Precipitation here averages 18 inches (460 mm) to 22 inches (560 mm) per year. This region is a transition zone between the tall grasses to the southeast and the mid and short grasses to the west. In this zone, the eastern portion and river valleys have characteristics of the tall grass region, and the western part as well as well-drained land have similarities to the mid and short grass prairies. Common grasses here are needlegrass and needle-and-thread grass.

=== Mid and short grass prairies ===
Plants in the mid and short grass prairies average about 6 inches (150 mm) with a maximum height of about 1 foot (0.30 m). Short grasses live in well-drained regions and mid grasses are in lowlands. Porcupine grass, needlegrass, western wheatgrass and prairie June grass are the predominant grasses, while the lead plant and prairie rose are the most common shrubs. Prairie clover and goldenrod are herbs in this region; the pineapple flower and pasque flower are seasonal flowers. The pasque flower is the South Dakota state flower. While antelope and bison were common in prior centuries, modern animal life consists of deer, jackrabbit, skunk, badger, pocket gopher, and weasel. Pheasants, ducks, geese, sparrows, hawks, owls, and larks are the common birds, while bull snakes and blue racers have replaced the prairie rattler as the most common reptiles.

=== Short and mid grass prairies ===
Steppe grasslands predominate in the western two-thirds of South Dakota. Precipitation is irregular and averages 13 inches (330 mm) to 18 inches (460 mm) per year. Hailstorms, blizzards, and thunderstorms rush across the prairie, which has little shelter for plants or animals. Nevertheless, many animals make their home here: among them, grey wolf, coyote, antelope, jackrabbit, kit fox, and bison. The rattlesnake and bull snake live in this prairie, as well as the blue racer. Many birds have their habitat here: geese, ducks, falcons, hawks, turkey buzzards, owls, sparrows, larks, blackbirds, and more. Evening primroses, prairie lilies, blazing star, aster, goldenrod, sunflower, and wild onions are common plants. So too are wild alfalfa, buffalo bean, and prairie clover legumes. Vegetation is predominantly blue grama, little bluestem, bunchgrass, buffalograss, wheatgrass, and green needleleaf.

=== The coniferous Black Hills ===
Due to higher elevation and precipitation, the ecology of the Black Hills differs significantly from that of the plains. The mountains are thickly blanketed by coniferous needleleaf evergreens: various types of pines—including ponderosa (covering 1,000,000 acres (400,000 ha), or 80% of the Black Hills forest), lodgepole, white, and limber—as well as western red cedar and spruces. Western yellow ponderosa is the most important lumber tree in the area. The South Dakota state tree is the Black Hills spruce. The Red Valley is home to blue-joint and bluegrasses, and wild plum, Juneberry, and chokecherry shrubs grow in the Hills. Violets, thistles, and horse mint are prevalent herbs. Vines grow widely: the woodbine, bittersweet, and wild grape, which is the pattern for Black Hills gold jewelry.

Black Hills mammals include deer, elk (wapiti), bighorn sheep, mountain goats, and mountain lions, while the streams and lakes contain several species of trout. Cottontail rabbits and Black-tailed jackrabbit live throughout the Hills, as do squirrels, raccoons, chipmunks, and porcupines. Wild burro and bobcat can be found, as well as bison in limited quantity. Woodpecker, robin, sparrow, jay, bobwhite, and wren are Black Hills birds.

=== Birds ===
South Dakota's varied geography is inhabited by many species of birds. The state bird, the ring-necked pheasant, has adapted particularly well to the area after being introduced from China, and growing populations of bald eagles are spread throughout the state, especially near the Missouri River. The wild turkey is another large bird found in many areas of the state. The numerous lakes and wetlands of eastern South Dakota support migratory populations of Canada geese, snow geese, mallards, pelicans, and wood ducks. The prairie serves as home to songbirds such as meadowlarks (both the eastern and western varieties), goldfinches, and bluebirds, and the open landscape of the plains also suits many carnivorous birds, such as hawks, falcons, and owls.

== Climate ==
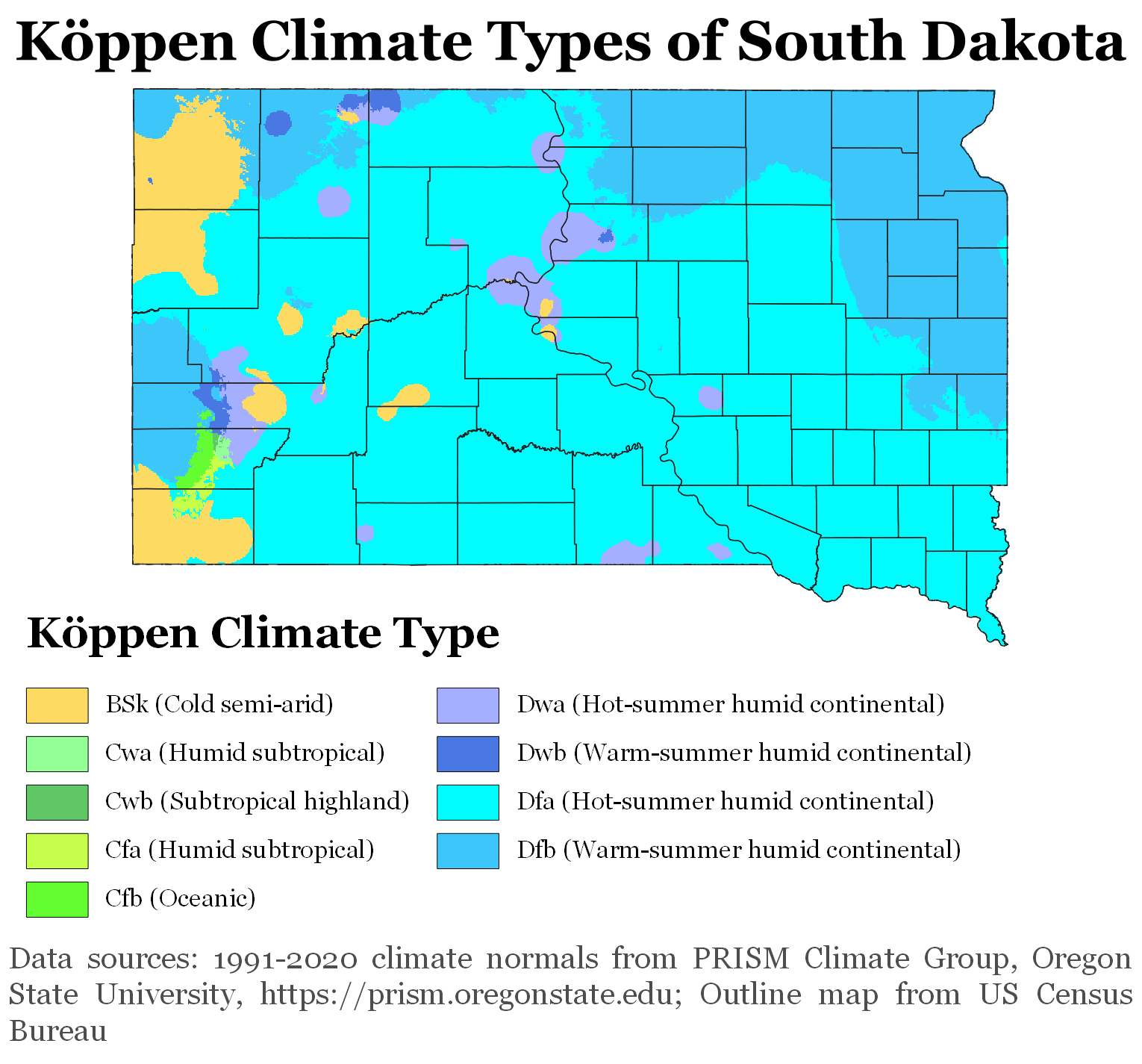
Köppen climate types of South Dakota, using 1991-2020 climate normals.

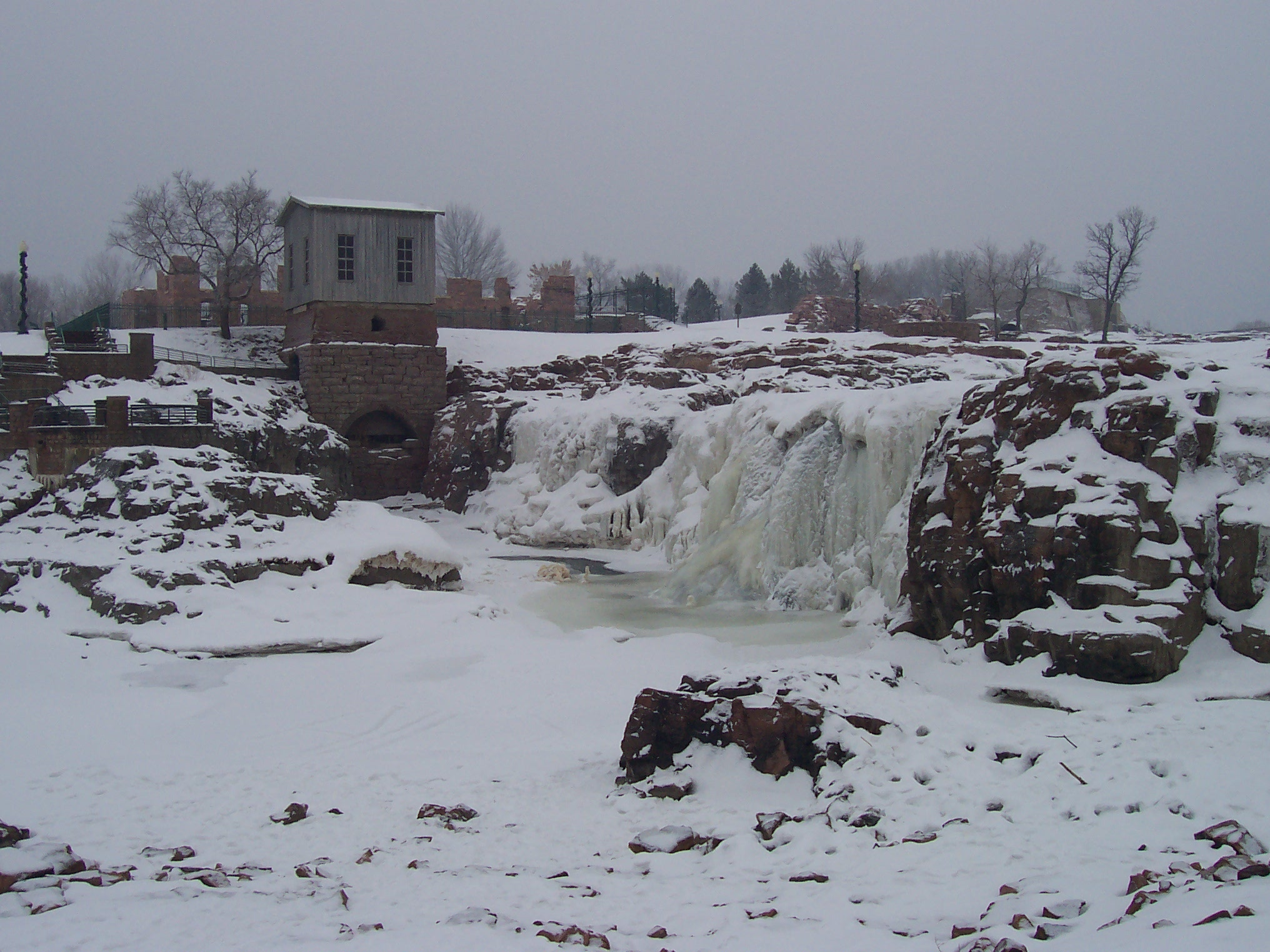
The falls of the Big Sioux River in Falls Park, Sioux Falls, frozen over in winter.

South Dakota has a continental climate, semi-arid in the west outside of the Black Hills, with four distinct seasons, ranging from very cold winters to hot summers. During the summers, the average high temperature throughout the state is often close to 90 °F or 32.2 °C, although it generally cools down to near 60 °F or 15.6 °C at night. It is not unusual for South Dakota to have severe hot, dry spells in the summer with the temperature climbing above 100 °F or 37.8 °C several times every year. Winters are cold with January high temperatures averaging below freezing and low temperatures averaging below 10 °F (−12.2 °C) in most of the state, although especially in the west winter temperatures are extremely variable and chinook winds will raise temperatures above 50 °F or 10 °C several times during most winters. The highest temperature recorded in the state was 120 °F (48.9 °C) on July 5, 1936, in Gann Valley, and the lowest was −58 °F (−50 °C) on February 17, 1936, in McIntosh.

Average annual precipitation in South Dakota ranges from semi-arid in the northwestern part of the state (around 15 inches, or 381 mm) to semi-humid around the southeast portion of the state (around 25 inches or 635 millimetres), although a small area centered on Lead in the Black Hills has the highest precipitation at nearly 30 inches or 762 millimetres per year.

South Dakota summers bring frequent thunderstorms which can be severe with high winds, thunder, and hail. The eastern part of the state is often considered part of Tornado Alley, and South Dakota experiences an average of 29 tornadoes per year. Winters are somewhat more stable, although severe weather in the form of blizzards and ice storms can occur during the season. Severe weather in the state can occasionally turn deadly. Between 1950 and 1994, 11 people were killed by tornadoes in the state, and the 1972 Black Hills flood tore through central Rapid City, killing 238 people and causing hundreds of millions of dollars in damage.

=== Climate data ===
Monthly average high and low temperatures for various South Dakota Cities (°F)
City	Jan	Feb	Mar	Apr	May	Jun	Jul	Aug	Sep	Oct	Nov	Dec
Aberdeen	21/1	29/9	40/21	57/33	70/46	79/55	85/60	84/57	73/47	59/34	39/20	26/6
Huron	25/4	31/11	43/22	58/34	70/46	80/55	86/61	84/59	75/47	61/35	41/21	29/8
Rapid City	34/10	38/14	45/21	55/31	65/42	75/52	83/58	82/55	73/45	61/34	44/21	37/13
Sioux Falls	25/3	32/10	44/21	59/33	71/45	81/55	86/60	83/58	74/48	61/35	42/21	29/8

Climate data for Sioux Falls (Köppen Dfa)
Month	Jan	Feb	Mar	Apr	May	Jun	Jul	Aug	Sep	Oct	Nov	Dec	Year
Record high °F (°C)	66 (19)	70 (21)	88 (31)	98 (37)	104 (40)	110 (43)	110 (43)	109 (43)	104 (40)	94 (34)	82 (28)	63 (17)	110 (43)
Mean maximum °F (°C)	47 (8)	53 (12)	70 (21)	82 (28)	88 (31)	93 (34)	95 (35)	94 (34)	90 (32)	82 (28)	67 (19)	50 (10)	97 (36)
Mean daily maximum °F (°C)	27.2 (−2.7)	32.0 (0.0)	45.0 (7.2)	59.0 (15.0)	70.8 (21.6)	80.9 (27.2)	85.3 (29.6)	82.8 (28.2)	75.6 (24.2)	61.1 (16.2)	45.0 (7.2)	31.6 (−0.2)	58.0 (14.4)
Daily mean °F (°C)	17.9 (−7.8)	22.3 (−5.4)	34.7 (1.5)	47.2 (8.4)	59.1 (15.1)	69.9 (21.1)	74.4 (23.6)	72.0 (22.2)	63.8 (17.7)	49.6 (9.8)	34.8 (1.6)	22.5 (−5.3)	47.4 (8.6)
Mean daily minimum °F (°C)	8.5 (−13.1)	12.6 (−10.8)	24.3 (−4.3)	35.5 (1.9)	47.5 (8.6)	58.8 (14.9)	63.4 (17.4)	61.1 (16.2)	51.9 (11.1)	38.1 (3.4)	24.5 (−4.2)	13.4 (−10.3)	36.6 (2.6)
Mean minimum °F (°C)	−16 (−27)	−10 (−23)	−1 (−18)	18 (−8)	31 (−1)	44 (7)	49 (9)	47 (8)	34 (1)	20 (−7)	4 (−16)	−9 (−23)	−19 (−28)
Record low °F (°C)	−38 (−39)	−42 (−41)	−23 (−31)	4 (−16)	17 (−8)	32 (0)	34 (1)	34 (1)	13 (−11)	−5 (−21)	−17 (−27)	−31 (−35)	−42 (−41)
Average precipitation inches (mm)	0.60 (15)	0.83 (21)	1.60 (41)	3.00 (76)	3.86 (98)	4.23 (107)	3.25 (83)	3.34 (85)	2.73 (69)	2.36 (60)	1.22 (31)	0.83 (21)	27.85 (707)
Average snowfall inches (cm)	8.0 (20)	8.6 (22)	7.2 (18)	5.1 (13)	0.1 (0.25)	0.0 (0.0)	0.0 (0.0)	0.0 (0.0)	0.0 (0.0)	1.4 (3.6)	6.2 (16)	8.7 (22)	45.3 (115)
Average precipitation days (≥ 0.01 in)	7.0	7.0	8.2	10.2	12.1	11.8	9.0	9.4	8.1	7.9	6.2	7.0	103.9
Average snowy days (≥ 0.1 in)	7.3	6.8	5.1	2.2	0.1	0.0	0.0	0.0	0.0	0.9	3.5	6.9	32.8
Average relative humidity (%)	71.7	73.3	72.1	64.5	63.5	65.4	65.4	67.9	69.5	67.2	73.4	75.5	69.1
Average dew point °F (°C)	6.4 (−14.2)	12.6 (−10.8)	23.4 (−4.8)	33.6 (0.9)	44.8 (7.1)	55.2 (12.9)	60.6 (15.9)	58.8 (14.9)	49.5 (9.7)	36.9 (2.7)	24.4 (−4.2)	12.0 (−11.1)	34.9 (1.6)
Average ultraviolet index	1	2	4	5	7	8	9	8	6	3	2	1	5
Source 1: NOAA (relative humidity and dew point 1961–1990)
Source 2: Weather Atlas (UV index)

Climate data for Pierre (Köppen Dfa)
Month	Jan	Feb	Mar	Apr	May	Jun	Jul	Aug	Sep	Oct	Nov	Dec	Year
Record high °F (°C)	68 (20)	75 (24)	88 (31)	98 (37)	105 (41)	112 (44)	117 (47)	114 (46)	108 (42)	98 (37)	87 (31)	77 (25)	117 (47)
Mean daily maximum °F (°C)	29.0 (−1.7)	33.7 (0.9)	45.7 (7.6)	58.5 (14.7)	69.5 (20.8)	80.0 (26.7)	88.3 (31.3)	86.6 (30.3)	77.5 (25.3)	60.7 (15.9)	44.9 (7.2)	32.4 (0.2)	58.9 (14.9)
Daily mean °F (°C)	19.1 (−7.2)	23.2 (−4.9)	34.3 (1.3)	45.9 (7.7)	57.2 (14.0)	67.8 (19.9)	74.9 (23.8)	73.0 (22.8)	63.6 (17.6)	48.5 (9.2)	34.1 (1.2)	22.8 (−5.1)	47.0 (8.3)
Mean daily minimum °F (°C)	9.3 (−12.6)	12.6 (−10.8)	22.9 (−5.1)	33.3 (0.7)	44.9 (7.2)	55.6 (13.1)	61.6 (16.4)	59.4 (15.2)	49.7 (9.8)	36.2 (2.3)	23.2 (−4.9)	13.2 (−10.4)	35.2 (1.8)
Record low °F (°C)	−33 (−36)	−35 (−37)	−20 (−29)	0 (−18)	21 (−6)	34 (1)	42 (6)	39 (4)	21 (−6)	2 (−17)	−18 (−28)	−31 (−35)	−35 (−37)
Average precipitation inches (mm)	0.45 (11)	0.74 (19)	0.96 (24)	1.93 (49)	3.25 (83)	3.69 (94)	2.39 (61)	1.95 (50)	1.74 (44)	1.69 (43)	0.77 (20)	0.64 (16)	20.20 (513)
Average snowfall inches (cm)	5.1 (13)	8.0 (20)	5.0 (13)	5.3 (13)	0.0 (0.0)	0.0 (0.0)	0.0 (0.0)	0.0 (0.0)	0.0 (0.0)	1.3 (3.3)	6.3 (16)	6.2 (16)	37.2 (94)
Average precipitation days (≥ 0.01 in)	5.9	5.8	5.6	8.7	11.0	11.4	9.1	7.9	6.4	6.8	5.3	5.6	89.5
Average snowy days (≥ 0.1 in)	5.6	5.3	3.3	2.0	0.0	0.0	0.0	0.0	0.0	0.7	3.9	5.2	26.0
Source: NOAA

== Protected areas ==
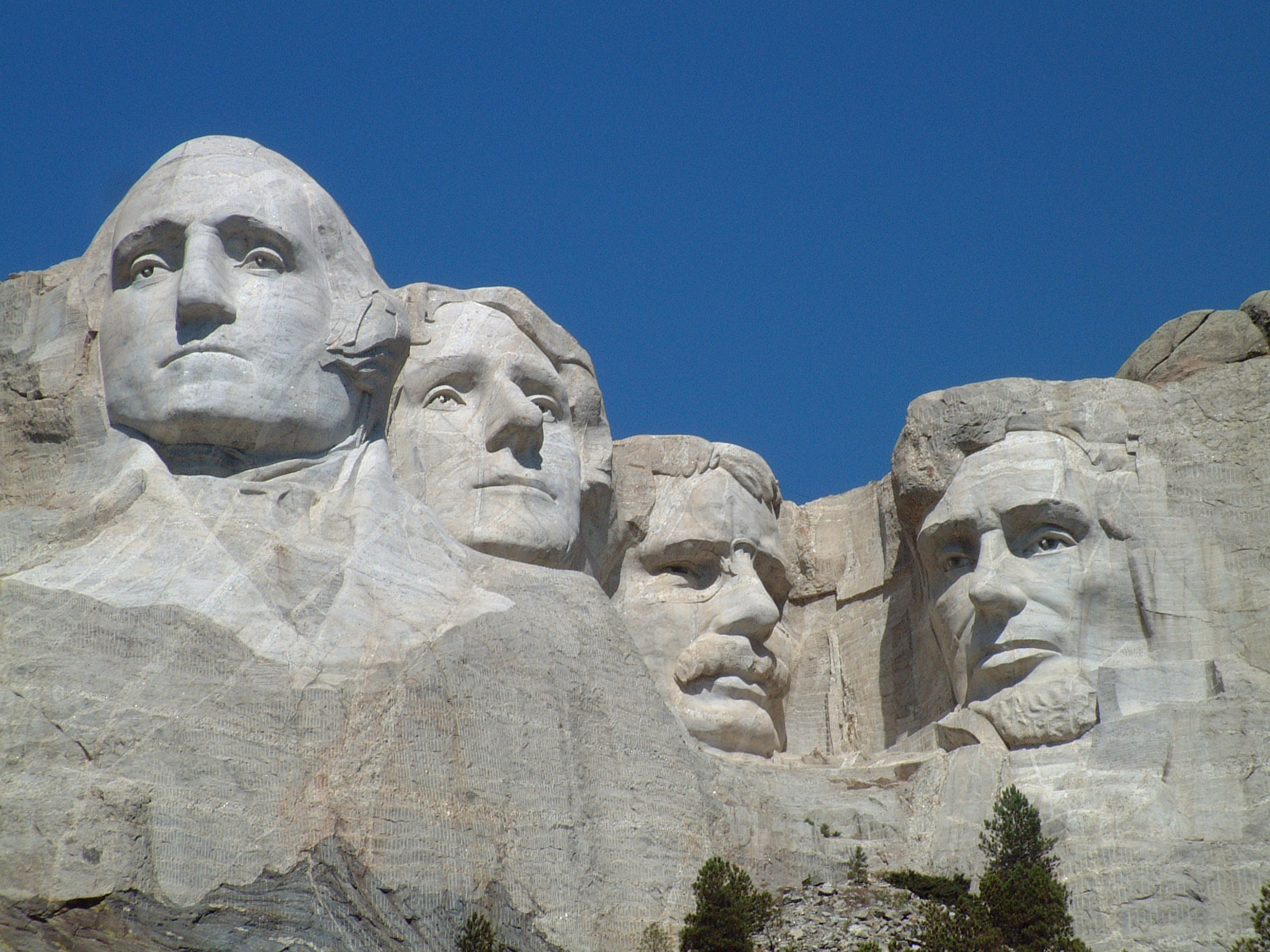
Mount Rushmore National Memorial in the Black Hills

South Dakota contains several sites that are protected by the National Park Service. Two national parks have been established in South Dakota, both of which are located in the southwestern part of the state. Badlands National Park was created in 1978. The park features a highly eroded, brightly colored landscape surrounded by semi-arid grasslands. Wind Cave National Park, established in 1903 in the Black Hills, contains an extensive cave network as well as a large herd of bison. Mount Rushmore National Memorial in the Black Hills was established in 1925. The well-known attraction features a mountain carved by sculptor Gutzon Borglum to resemble four former U.S. presidents. Other areas managed by the National Park Service include Jewel Cave National Monument near Custer, the Lewis and Clark National Historic Trail, the Minuteman Missile National Historic Site, which features a decommissioned nuclear missile silo, and the Missouri National Recreational River. In addition to the National Park Service, the United States Forest Service manages several areas in the state. South Dakota contains two national forests, Black Hills National Forest and a small section of Custer National Forest, and three national grasslands: Buffalo Gap, Grand River, and Fort Pierre.

South Dakota also contains numerous state parks, all of which are managed by the South Dakota Department of Game, Fish, and Parks. Custer State Park in the Black Hills is a large state park with over 71,000 acres, and includes Sylvan Lake, Needles Highway, and a wildlife loop featuring a large bison herd and the "begging burros", among other species. Other notable parks in the state include Bear Butte State Park near Sturgis and Lewis and Clark State Recreation Area near Yankton.

== Human geography ==
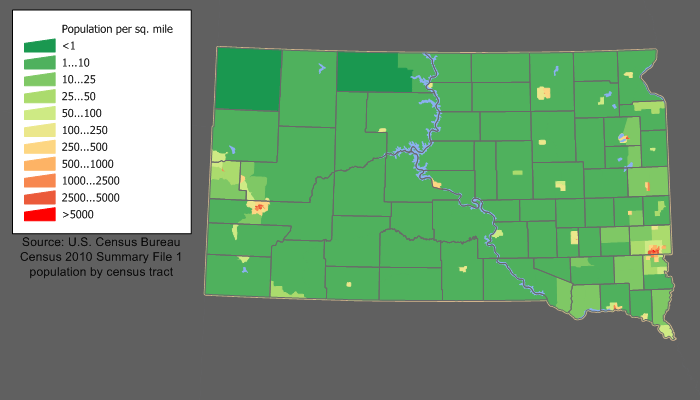
South Dakota Population Density Map

According to the U.S. Census Bureau, in 2010 South Dakota had a population of 814,180. As of the 2010 census, the state ranked fifth-lowest in the United States in both total population as well as population density. The center of population of South Dakota is located in Buffalo County, in the unincorporated county seat of Gann Valley.

The five largest ancestry groups in South Dakota are: German (40.7%), Norwegian (15.3%), Irish (10.4%), Native American (8.3%), and English (7.1%). German-Americans are the largest ancestry group in most parts of the state, although there are also large Scandinavian populations in some counties. American Indians, largely Lakota, Dakota, and Nakota (Sioux) are predominant in several counties, mostly in the western part of the state. South Dakota has the third-highest proportion of Native Americans of any state.

Rural areas in South Dakota are experiencing a trend of falling populations, despite an overall increase in population. The effect of rural flight has not been spread evenly through South Dakota, however. Although most rural counties and small towns have lost population, the Sioux Falls area and the Black Hills have gained population. In fact, Lincoln County, near Sioux Falls, is the ninth fastest-growing county (by percentage) in the United States. The growth in these areas has compensated for losses in the rest of the state, and South Dakota's total population continues to increase steadily, albeit at a slower rate than the national average.

=== Cities and counties ===
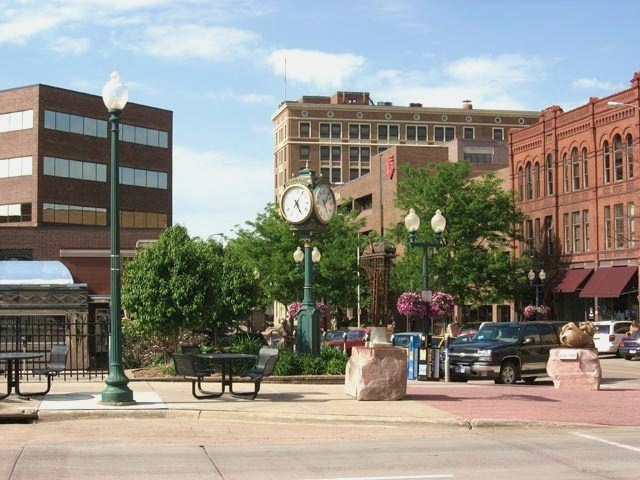
Sioux Falls, with a population of just over 184,000 in 2019, is the largest city in South Dakota.

South Dakota is relatively notable for its lack of large urban centers. Sioux Falls, the largest city in the state, only ranks as the 135th largest in the country, and the state's third-largest city, Aberdeen, has a population of less than 25,000. However, because the population in many rural areas has decreased over the last 50 years, and many cities in the state have grown at a rapid pace; the population has become more concentrated and less rural than it once was. According to 2007 census estimates, the three most populous counties in the state, Minnehaha, Pennington, and Lincoln, were home to 38.8% of South Dakotans, while in 1910, those counties held only 9.3% of the population.

Sioux Falls is the largest city in South Dakota, with an estimated 2019 population of 184,000, and a metropolitan area population of 227,171. The city is located in the southeast corner of the state, and was founded in 1856. The economy of Sioux Falls, originally focused on agri-business and quarrying, has recently become largely centered on retail and financial services. Rapid City, with a 2007 estimated population of 63,997, and a metropolitan area population of 120,279, is the second-largest city in the state. It is located on the eastern edge of the Black Hills in western South Dakota, and was founded in 1876. Rapid City's economy is largely based on tourism and defense spending, due to the close proximity of tourist attractions in the Black Hills and Ellsworth Air Force Base. The next eight largest cities in the state, in order of descending 2007 population, are Aberdeen (24,410), Watertown (20,530), Brookings (19,463), Mitchell (14,832), Pierre (14,032), Yankton (13,643), Huron (10,902), and Vermillion (10,251). Pierre is the state capital, and Brookings and Vermillion are the locations of the state's two largest universities. Of the ten largest cities in the state, Rapid City is the only one located west of the Missouri River.

=== Economy ===
South Dakota's early economy relied heavily on the soil, minerals and ecology of the area, as nearly all of the earliest white settlers in the area were farmers, miners, or trappers. Although other economic sectors have risen in prominence in recent years, early dependence on the land laid the foundation for the future economic activity of the state.

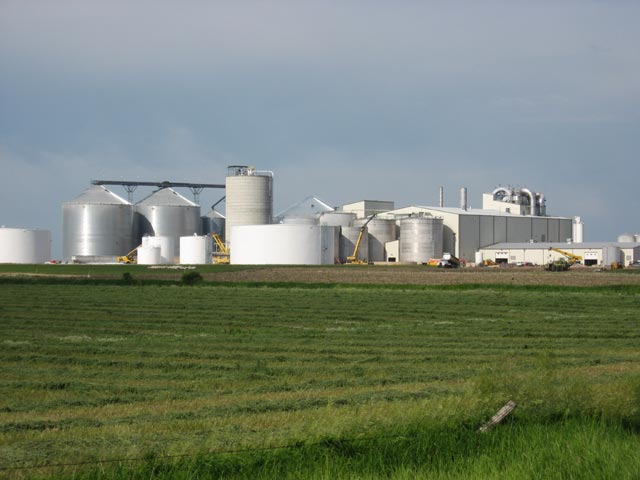
Ethanol plant in Turner County

Agriculture has historically been a key component of the South Dakota economy. Although other industries have expanded rapidly in recent decades, agricultural production is still very important to the state's economy, especially in rural areas. The five most valuable agricultural products in South Dakota are cattle, corn (maize), soybeans, wheat, and hogs. Agriculture-related industries such as meat packing and ethanol production also have a considerable economic impact on the state. South Dakota is one of the largest producers of ethanol in the nation.

Another important sector in South Dakota's economy is tourism. Many travel to visit the national parks, state parks, and national monuments in the state, particularly those of the Black Hills region. South Dakota's location between national parks in the west and large cities to the east also contributes to the state's tourism and hospitality industry. In 2006, tourism provided an estimated 33,000 jobs in the state and contributed over two billion US$ to the economy of South Dakota.

=== Transportation ===
South Dakota has a total of 83,609 miles (134,556 km) of highways, roads, and streets, along with 679 miles (1,093 km) of interstate highways. Two major interstates pass through South Dakota: Interstate 90, which runs east and west; and Interstate 29, running north and south in the eastern portion of the state. Also located in the state are the shorter interstates 190 and 229. Several major U.S. highways pass through the state. U.S. routes 12, 14, 16, 18, and 212 travel east and west, while U.S. routes 81, 83, 85 and 281 run north and south. Railroads have played an important role in South Dakota transportation since the mid-nineteenth century. Some 4,420 miles (7,113 km) of railroad track were built in South Dakota during the late nineteenth and early twentieth centuries, but only 1,839 miles (2,959 km) of railroad are currently operational. South Dakota's largest commercial airports are located at Sioux Falls and Rapid City.

== Bibliography ==
- Thompson, Harry F., ed. (2009). A New South Dakota History (Second ed.). Sioux Falls, SD: The Center for Western Studies – Augustana College. ISBN 978-0-931170-00-3.
