= Angostura ossana =

Conservation status
- Extinct (1965) (IUCN 3.1)

Scientific classification
- Kingdom: Plantae
- Clade: Tracheophytes
- Clade: Angiosperms
- Clade: Eudicots
- Clade: Rosids
- Order: Sapindales
- Family: Rutaceae
- Genus: Angostura
- Species: †A. ossana

Binomial name
- †Angostura ossana DC.

Synonyms
- Cusparia ossana (DC.) Beurton; Galipea ossana DC; Raputia ossana (DC.) Engl.; Sciuris ossana Nees & Mart. ex Steud.

Extinct species of flowering plant

Angostura ossana, also known as quina del país, is an extinct species of flowering plant in the family Rutaceae. It was a tree endemic to one location at San Diego de los Baños, Los Palacios in Pinar del Río Province of western Cuba. It went extinct due to overlogging for its wood and bark.
