= Angostura alipes =

Conservation status
- Critically Endangered (IUCN 3.1)

Scientific classification
- Kingdom: Plantae
- Clade: Tracheophytes
- Clade: Angiosperms
- Clade: Eudicots
- Clade: Rosids
- Order: Sapindales
- Family: Rutaceae
- Genus: Angostura
- Species: A. alipes

Binomial name
- Angostura alipes Kallunki

Species of flowering plant

Angostura alipes is a species of plant in the family Rutaceae. It is endemic to Ecuador.
