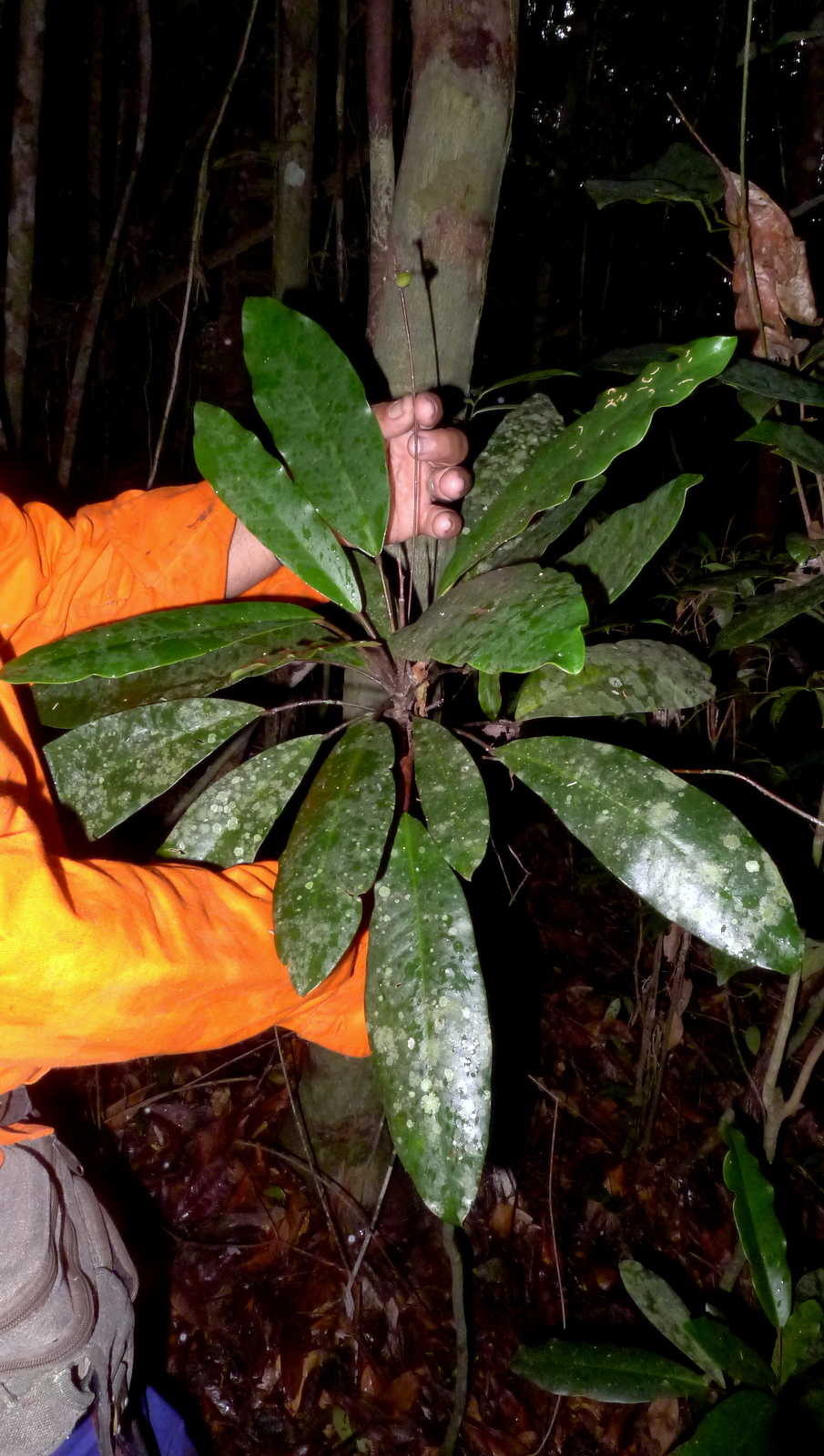
- Conchocarpus macrophyllus (Brazil)

Scientific classification
- Kingdom: Plantae
- Clade: Tracheophytes
- Clade: Angiosperms
- Clade: Eudicots
- Clade: Rosids
- Order: Sapindales
- Family: Rutaceae
- Subfamily: Zanthoxyloideae
- Genus: Conchocarpus; J.C.Mikan

Type species
- Conchocarpus macrophyllus J.C.Mikan

Species
- See text.

= Conchocarpus =

Genus of flowering plants

Conchocarpus is a plant genus in the family Rutaceae.

== species ==
- Conchocarpus acuminatus
- Conchocarpus adenantherus
- Conchocarpus bellus
- Conchocarpus cauliflorus
- Conchocarpus concinnus
- Conchocarpus cuneifolius
- Conchocarpus cyrtanthus
- Conchocarpus dasyanthus
- Conchocarpus diadematus
- Conchocarpus elegans
- Conchocarpus fanshawei
- Conchocarpus fissicalyx
- Conchocarpus fontanesianus
- Conchocarpus furcatus
- Conchocarpus gaudichaudianus
- Conchocarpus grandiflorus
- Conchocarpus grandis
- Conchocarpus guyanensis
- Conchocarpus heterophyllus
- Conchocarpus hirsutus
- Conchocarpus inopinatus
- Conchocarpus insignis
- Conchocarpus jirajaranus Kallunki & W. Meier
- Conchocarpus larensis
- Conchocarpus longifolius
- Conchocarpus longipes
- Conchocarpus macrocarpus
- Conchocarpus macrophyllus
- Conchocarpus marginatus
- Conchocarpus mastigophorus
- Conchocarpus modestus
- Conchocarpus nicaraguensis
- Conchocarpus obovatus
- Conchocarpus odoratissimus
- Conchocarpus oppositifolius
- Conchocarpus ovatus
- Conchocarpus paniculatus
- Conchocarpus pentandrus
- Conchocarpus punctatus
- Conchocarpus ramiflorus
- Conchocarpus santosii
- Conchocarpus silvestris
- Conchocarpus sordidus
- Conchocarpus toxicarius
- Conchocarpus transitionalis
- Conchocarpus ucayalinus
