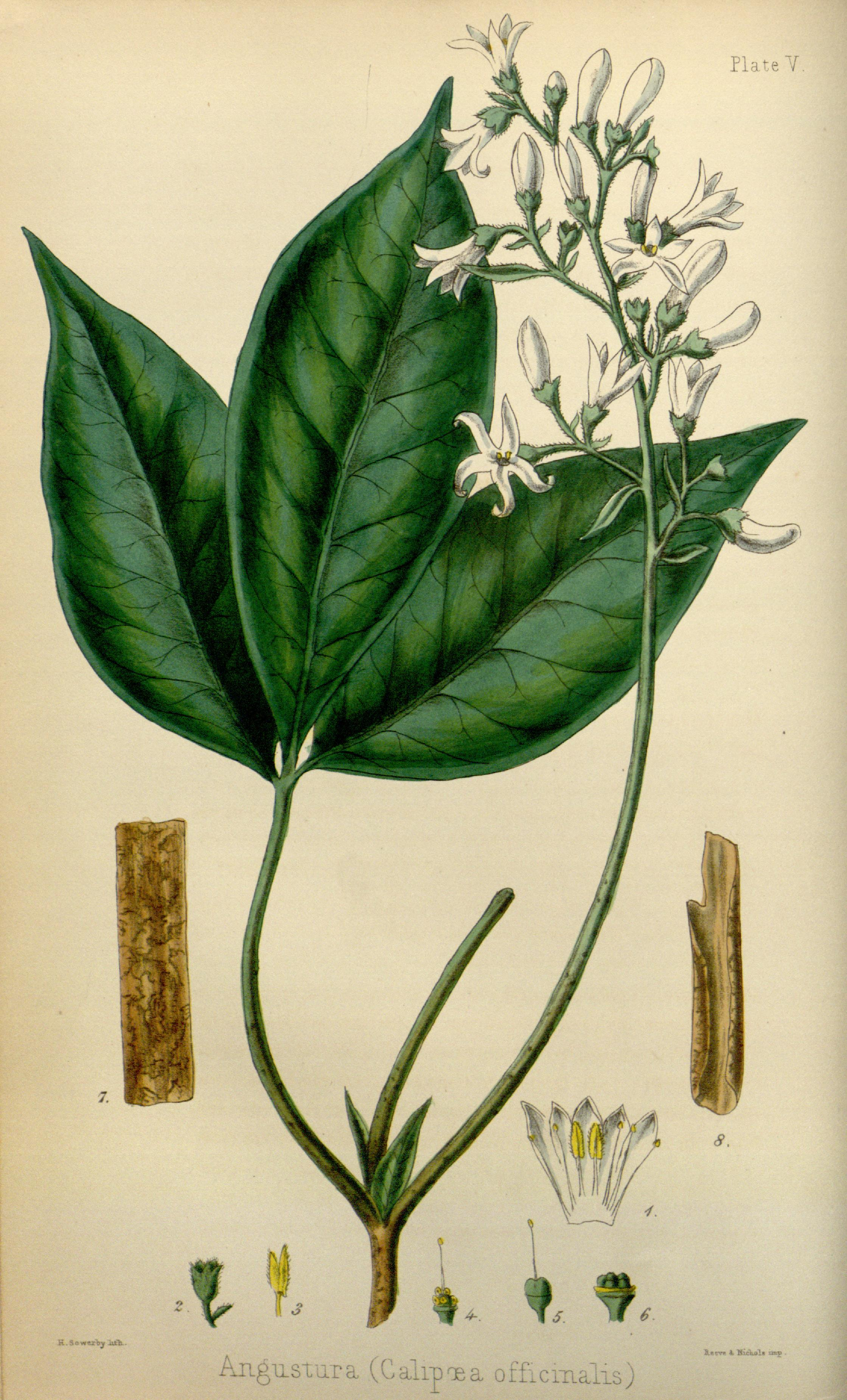
- Illustration of Angostura trifoliata as Galipea officinalis

Scientific classification
- Kingdom: Plantae
- Clade: Tracheophytes
- Clade: Angiosperms
- Clade: Eudicots
- Clade: Rosids
- Order: Sapindales
- Family: Rutaceae
- Genus: Angostura
- Species: A. trifoliata

Binomial name
- Angostura trifoliata (Willd.) T.S.Elias

Synonyms
- Bonplandia trifoliata Willd.; Cusparia febrifuga Humb. ex DC.; Cusparia trifoliata (Willd.) Engl.; Galipea officinalis Hancock

= Angostura trifoliata =

Species of flowering plant

Angostura trifoliata is a plant native to South America. It is an evergreen, growing 18 to 24 metres (59 to 79 ft) tall. The leaves are composed of three ovoid lanceolate leaflets. The flowers are purplish-white.

Angostura bark is used in the treatment of fevers, where it is believed to be as effective as quinine. It is also used in a number of aromatic bitters, such as Abbott's Bitters and Fever-Tree aromatic tonic water; however, it is not used in Angostura brand bitters, which is instead named after a town in Venezuela, now Ciudad Bolívar. This plant is used to flavor foods like candy and ice cream.

The bark is bruised and used to intoxicate fish.
