= San Diego de los Baños =

- Consejo Popular & Urban Settlement
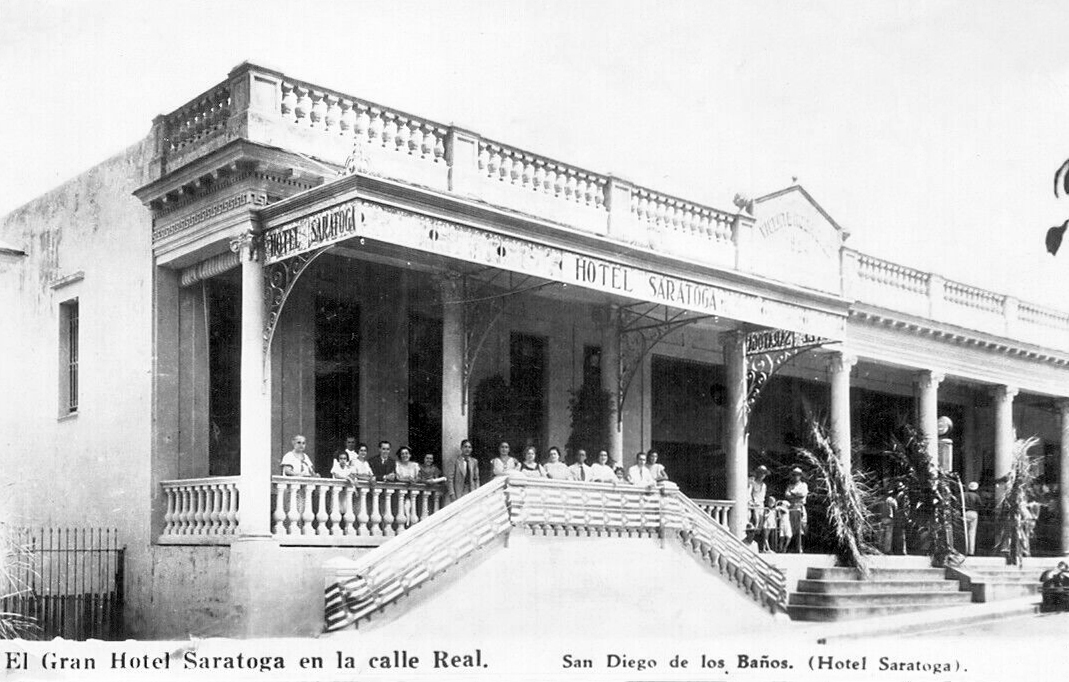
- Hotel Saragota, San Diego de los Baños, circa 1920

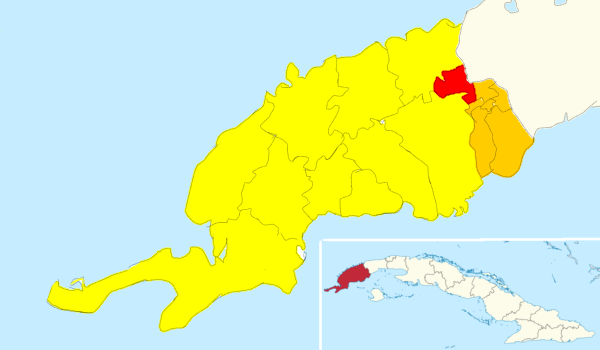
- San Diego de los Baños (Red) in Los Palacios (orange) in Pinar del Rio (yellow)

- Location within Cuba
- Coordinates: 22°38′48″N 83°22′09″W
- Country: Cuba
- Province: Pinar del Rio
- Municipalities: Los Palacios

Area
  - Total: 1.36 km^{2} (0.53 sq mi)

Population
  - Total: 3,306
  - Density: 2,430/km^{2} (6,300/sq mi)

San Diego de los Baños is a consejo popular ("popular council") and urban settlement in Los Palacios, Pinar del Río Province, Cuba.

== Geography ==
The consejo popular is in the east of the Pinar del Río Province. It is located 22 km north-east of Los Palacios, in the Vuelta Abajo area. It borders the consejos populares Entronque de Palacios to the east and Paso Quemado to the south-east. Pinar del Río is 56 km (by road) to the south-west.

It stands near the western end and at the foot of sierra de Rosarios, on the south side of that mountain range. The La Güira national park (in Spanish Parque nacional La Güira) is to the north of San Diego de los Baños.

Geologically, San Diego de los Baños stands on the Pinar fault in the Artemisa Formation.

== History ==
The settlement started after the discovery around 1632 of the healing power of a hot water spring nearby the Caiguanabo river (sp. Río Ariguanabo), by Taita Domingo, a slave on the San Pedro de las Galeras ranch who had become affected by some skin disease. This came to be known in the surroundings and people suffering from illnesses started to visit the place. In 1793 a hermitage opened under the name of San Diego and the place became known as "Baños de San Diego". Some say that Alexander von Humboldt visited the place in 1801; this seems very unlikely. He did pass at San Antonio de los Baños on his way from Havana to Batabanó anchorage, where he stayed from 6 to 8 March 1801; before boarding a boat en route to Trinidad. But the area he covered all in all in Cuba is, in his own terms, "the 100 square leagues between Havana, Matanzas and Batabano, next to Trinidad" (p. 350), and there is no mention of him visiting any place east of Havana.
In 1826 a road was built - a very significant feature in those times. The following year (1827) the hermitage was destroyed by a fire. Doctor François Antomarchi (Napoleon Bonaparte's private doctor) described the place in a memoir sent to Governor Miguel Tacon on April 11, 1837. In 1838 De la Torre y López presented a memoir about the importance of its healing waters to the count de Mopox y Jaruco. In 1838 the settlement had 72 houses, 5 assorted stores, 4 drugstores, 2 tobacco manufacturing businesses, 1 bakery, 1 pool cafe, 1 shoe store, 1 carpenter's, 1 school, and a population of 119.

French traveller fr:Alexandre Moreau de Jonnès (1778-1870), who had contributed to the foundation of a lithography workshop in Havana in 1838), visited San Diego de los Baños with Cuban writer Cirilo Villaverde (1812-1894). Villaverde subsequently mentioned the settlement in his book “Excursion to Vuelta Abajo”, published in 1839. From year 1841, the company "Bustamante f Cagigal y Cia." proposed voyages by boat from Batabano to the mouth of the river Dayaniguas (Caiguanabo river) at the price of 16.74 gold pesos per person; the remaining leg of the journey to San Diego was in carriages escorted by the Civil Guard. Urban planning stated that same year 1841 and was approved on January 2, 1844. The first hotel was the Cabarrouy Hotel, built in 1842; then the Hotel Bardino and Casa Soto opened, followed by the Cabancho, Bustamente, Soler, Evora and Julve Hotels. In 1844, an urban layout was drawn up. That year there were 92 inhabitants and the landowner, Don Luis Pedroso, replaced their huts with more durable buildings.

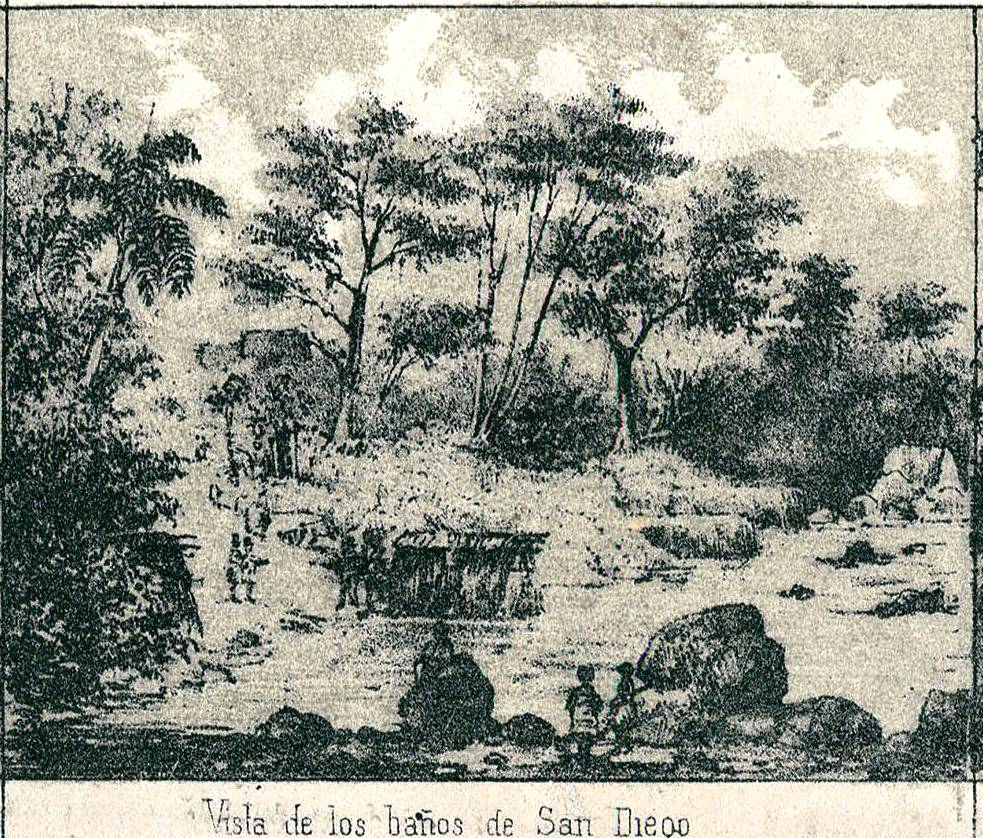
Los baños de San Diego, 1848

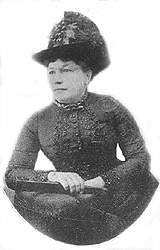
es:Isabel Rubio, brought her field hospital near San Diego de los Baños

In 1850 the first stone of the present day's church was laid for a town that already had 120 houses, of which 51 were masonry, and a fixed contingent of 137 inhabitants, not counting vacationers or seasonal bathers. In 1853 the Overseas Minister issued a communication informing that the Queen had approved the free transport, medical assistance and maintenance for the poor; from then on several thousand patients came annually to San Diego's baths. The town hall was built by royal order in 1866. The first permanent natural bath was installed in 1891, the same year as the creation of the charge of Director Médico de las Aguas Minero-Medicinales de Cuba; Dr. Manuel Sabas Castellanos y Arango was the first to hold that charge. The first balneotherapy centre was built towards the middle of the 19th century (?), with 8 artificial pools and 24 bath tubs.

As the fight for Cuban independence was gathering strength anew (see Cuban War of Independence), es:Isabel Rubio (1837-1898), from Guane, joined the conspiracy against the Spanish regime in 1882. She took charge of many medical necessities and was given the rank of captain by general Maceo on January 20, 1896. From Guane, she moved her field hospital towards the east to follow the fight. In February 1898 her field hospital was discovered at Galaron, 2.5 km north of San Diego de los Baños. Made prisoner with a severe injury to one leg, she was transferred to San Isidro Hospital in Pinar, where she died on February 15, 1898.

== Balneotherapy ==
Among the 15 cuban spa facilities, the 4 most in demand for the use of balneology are San Diego de los Baños, Elguea (Sagua La Grande, Villa Clara Province), Ciego Montero (Cienfuegos Province) et San José del Lago (Yaguajay, Sancti Spíritus Province).

The three main natural springs at San Diego are El Templado, El Tigre, La Gallina - smaller ones exist beside these. E1 Templado et El Tigre provide 9 to 10 litres/second and feed a number of collective and private pools. La Gallina provides 0,6 to 0,8 litres per second (51.84 to 69.12 cubic metres/day).

The waters of San Diego de los Baños classify as sulfated - bicarbonated - calcium and sulphur, with anomalous sulphate, silica, fluorine, strontium, iodine, bromine and radioactivity contents, and low mineralization. Their temperatures range between 35 and 40 degrees Celsius.

== Demographics ==
In 1991 it had a population of 2,444 and in 2002 it grew to 3,239. As of 2012 it had a population of 3,306.

== Places ==
The ruins of the Hacienda Cortina, only 5 km to the west, offer views; that many consider stunning, and gardens.

== See also ==
=== Bibliography ===
- R.L. Rodríguez-Pacheco, "Características de las aguas minerales y medicinales de Cuba" (Characteristics of mineral and medical waters of Cuba), Acta Geologica Hispanica, v. 33 (1998), nº 1-4, p. 373-393
- Patricia González, B. Peña, J. R. Fagundo, Margaret Suárez, C. Melián, F. R. Delgado, Aguas mineromedicinales en el occidente de Cuba, January 2002
