= Buffalo bean =

Buffalo bean is a common name for several plants and may refer to:

- Buffalo bean (Thermopsis rhombifolia)
- Buffalo bean (Mucuna pruriens)
