= Conchocarpus elegans =

Scientific classification
- Kingdom: Plantae
- Clade: Tracheophytes
- Clade: Angiosperms
- Clade: Eudicots
- Clade: Rosids
- Order: Sapindales
- Family: Rutaceae
- Genus: Conchocarpus
- Species: C. elegans

Binomial name
- Conchocarpus elegans (A.St.-Hil.) Kallunki & Pirani 1998

Synonyms
- Angostura elegans (A.St.-Hil.) Albuq.; Cusparia elegans (A.St.-Hil.) Engl.; Galipea elegans A.St.-Hil.

Species of tree

Conchocarpus elegans is a tree species in the genus Conchocarpus found in South-East Brazil (Rio de Janeiro).
