= Angostura (plant) =

Scientific classification
- Kingdom: Plantae
- Clade: Tracheophytes
- Clade: Angiosperms
- Clade: Eudicots
- Clade: Rosids
- Order: Sapindales
- Family: Rutaceae
- Subfamily: Zanthoxyloideae
- Genus: Angostura; Roem. & Schult.

Species
- See text

Synonyms
- Bonplandia Willd.; Cusparia Humb.

Genus of flowering plants

Angostura is a genus of medicinal plants native to the tropical Americas. Its bark is sometimes used in bitters.

== Species ==
12 species are accepted. Extinct species are indicated with a †.

- Angostura alipes Kallunki
- Angostura bracteata (Nees & Mart.) Kallunki
- Angostura granulosa (Kallunki) Kallunki
- Angostura kunorum McPherson
- Angostura longiflora (K.Krause) Kallunki
- Angostura magdalenensis (Cuatrec.) Albuq.
- Angostura martiana (A.St.-Hil.) Albuq.
- †Angostura ossana (DC.) Beurton
- Angostura quinquefolia Kallunki
- Angostura simplex Kallunki
- Angostura tapajozensis (Ducke) Albuq.
- Angostura trifoliata (Willd.) T.S.Elias
