= Horsemint =

Horsemint may refer to:

- Mentha longifolia, a wild mint, which is also known in England as Horsemint.
- Any plant in the genus Monarda, native to North America.
- Agastache urticifolia, mint family plant of the Great Basin in western United States
- Monarda punctata, a herbaceous plant in the mint family that is native to parts of North America
