= Climate change in South Dakota =

Climate change in the US state of South Dakota

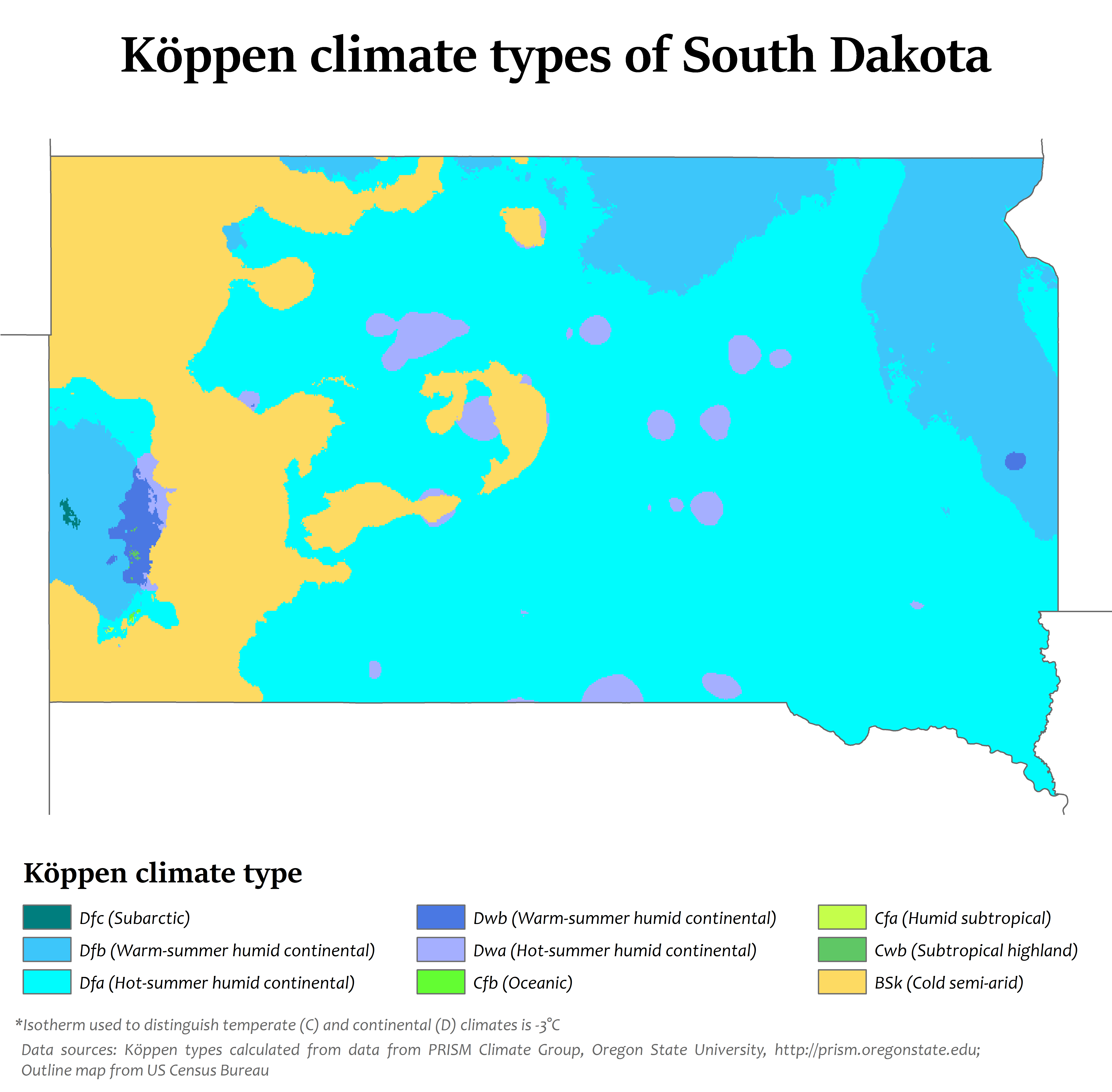
Köppen climate types in South Dakota showing the state to be largely hot-summer humid continental.

Climate change in South Dakota encompasses the effects of climate change, attributed to man-made increases in atmospheric carbon dioxide, in the U.S. state of South Dakota.

Due to South Dakota's location in the Northern Great Plains, the effects of climate change will vary from eastern South Dakota to western South Dakota. Eastern South Dakota can experience more flooding and western South Dakota can experience more droughts due to climate change. Climate change in South Dakota will directly impact agriculture, city planning and development as well as the tourism industry. According to the United States Environmental Protection Agency, "South Dakota's climate is changing. In the past century, most of the state has warmed by one to two degrees (F). Rainstorms are becoming more intense, and annual rainfall is increasing. In the coming decades, summers are likely to become increasingly hot, which may amplify some risks to human health and decrease yields of some crops while lengthening the growing season for others".

== Flooding ==
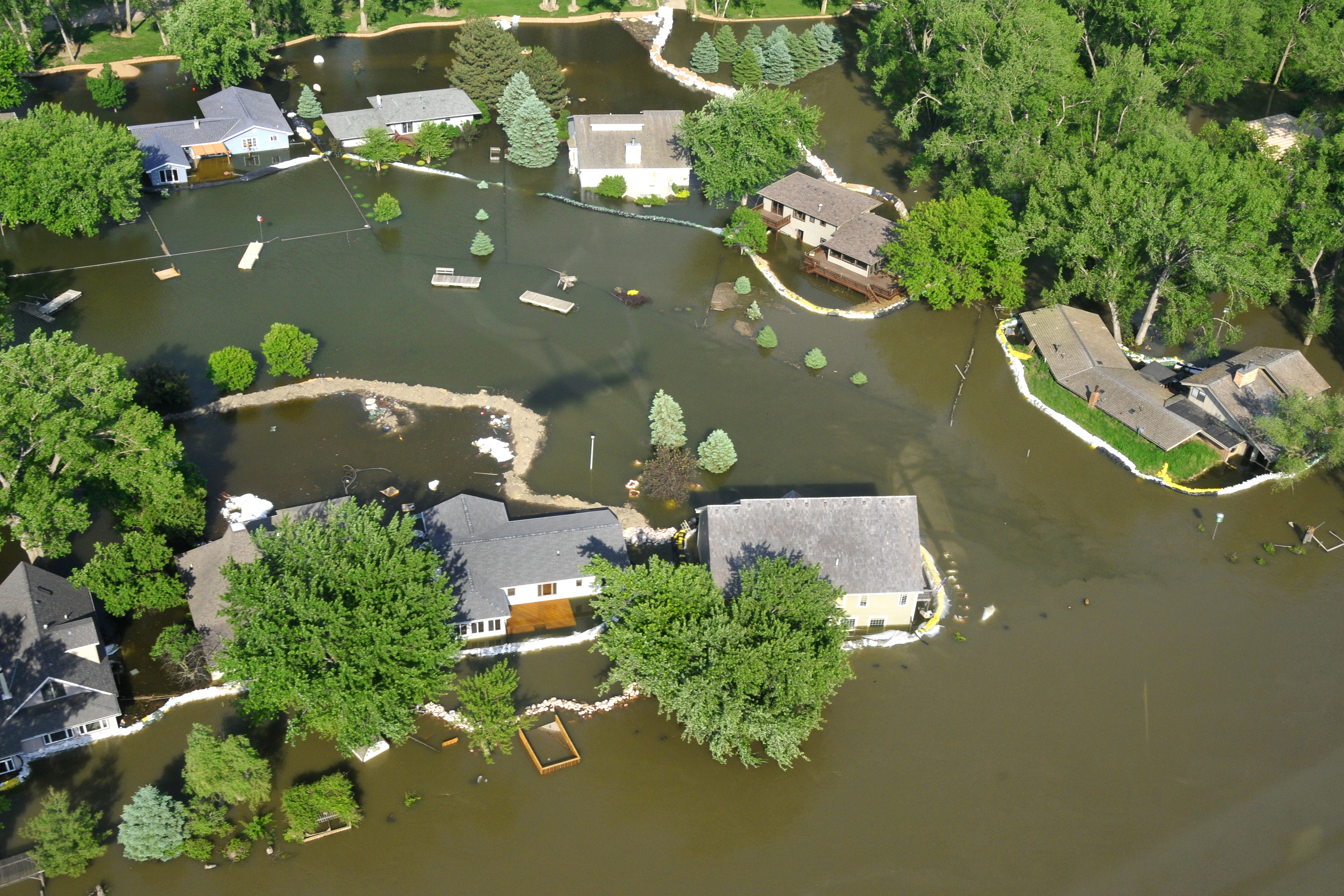
Flooded homes, 2011

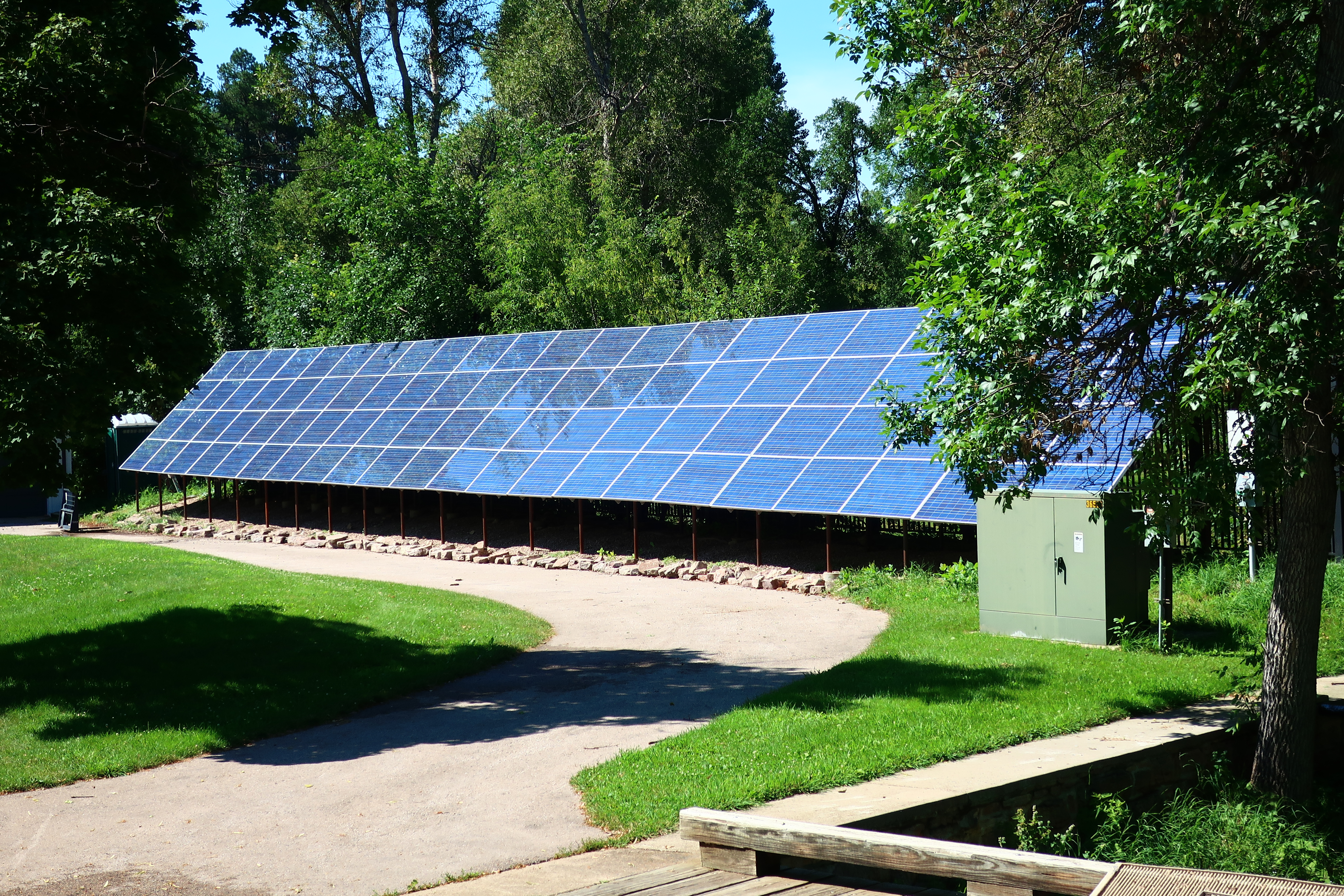
Solar panels, Spearfish

In the spring of 2019, the Big Sioux River and James River (Dakotas) experienced severe flooding. Effects of the flood episode included: delayed crop plantings, spread of noxious weeds, litter and debris scattered along river banks, damage to roads and bridges and a decline in canoeing and kayaking due to strong current.

== Heavy rains ==
On August 2, 2019, Huron set a new record of 3.26 in. of rainfall in one day, and an area south of Chamberlain reported 2.5 inches of rain in a half hour. Hecla reported 4.5 inches of rain, and Waubay reported 5 inches. On August 3, 2019, two weather stations in Hutchinson County reported 6.20 and 7 inches of rain. Some areas of the state have received 27 inches of rain in 2019, almost breaking the record of 28.71 inches in 1993. The EPA reports:

Changing climate is likely to increase the demand for water and make it more available. Rising temperatures increase evaporation and water use by plants, which make soils drier. But rainfall is likely to increase enough to allow soil moisture to increase slightly or remain about the same as today. More water is likely to run off into the Missouri River and its tributaries. The resulting increase in river flows could benefit recreational boating, public water supplies, and electric power generation. During droughts, decreased river flows can lower the water level in lakes and reservoirs, which may limit municipal water supplies and impair swimming, fishing, and other recreational activities. But if more water flows through the rivers before or during a drought, these problems will be less likely. Higher water flows also increase hydropower production, which accounts for almost 40 percent of the energy produced in South Dakota. Nevertheless, droughts are likely to become more severe in downstream states. When droughts lower water levels enough to impair navigation, the U.S. Army Corps of Engineers releases water from the upstream dams, making less water available to South Dakota.

A South Dakota board is mulling increased water pumping rights on the James River, which since the late 1990s has seen close to a 300 percent higher annual flow. (The James River starts in North Dakota and flows into the Missouri River in South Dakota.) “Climate is the likely dominant force causing the increase in the streamflow,” said Ms. Brittan Hullinger, a South Dakota natural resources engineer. “There have been increases in mean precipitation in every South Dakota county the James River runs through.” Board chair James Hutmacher asked her at an October 2024 meeting, “Is this from global warming?” Hullinger replied, “Generally, yes, but how much of it is human-caused is unknown,” Hullinger replied.

== Temperature increases ==
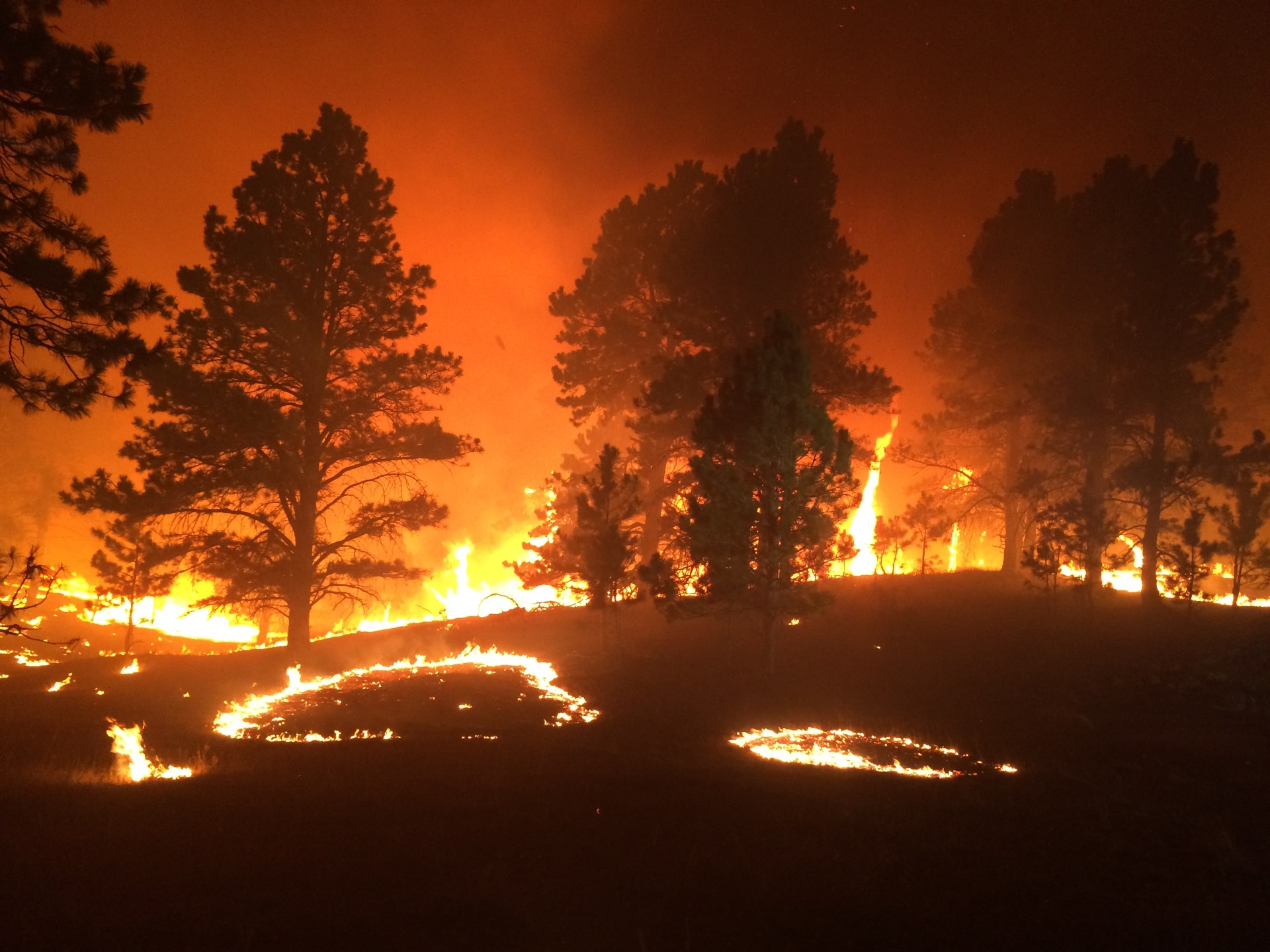
Auburn Fire outside Rapid City, 2023

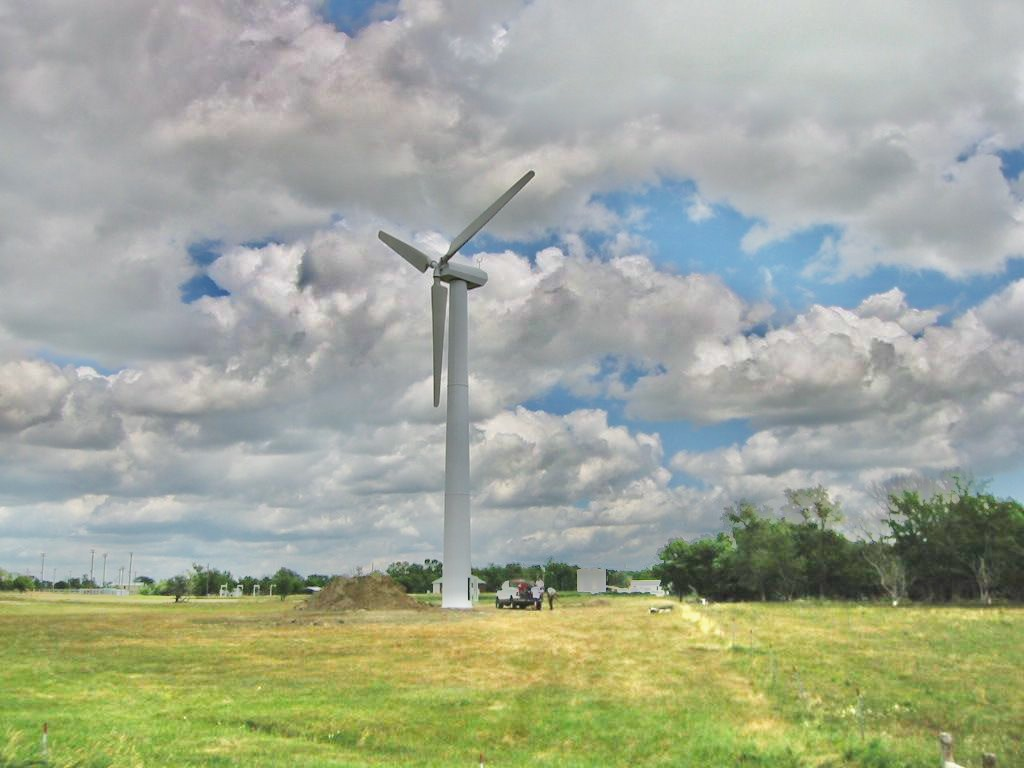
Wind turbine, Canova

Some of the greatest increases in average temperatures in the U.S. are expected in the region over the coming decades.

"A projected increase of 4.05 degrees Fahrenheit in average temperature is expected by 2065, and a projected increase of 9.37 degrees Fahrenheit in average temperature can be expected by the turn of the century if nothing is done to curb emissions. The average annual temperature in South Dakota has increased by about 2 degrees Fahrenheit since the beginning of the 20th century, and most of that warming has occurred in winter and spring. All but two of South Dakota’s top 10 warmest years on record have occurred since 1980, and four of the top 10 warmest years have been registered since 2005."

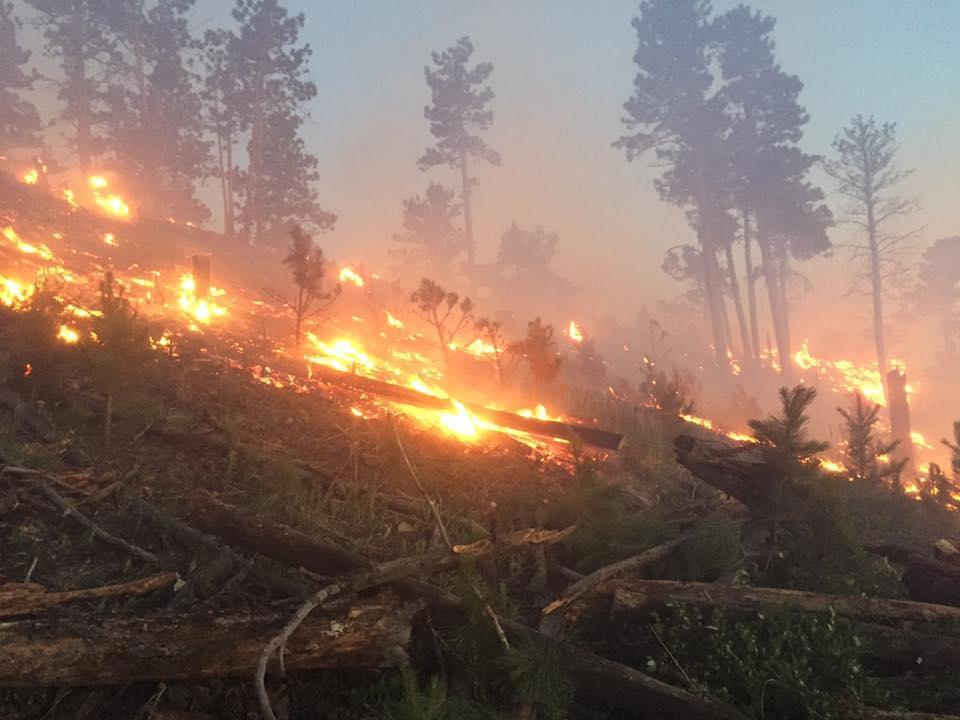
Wildfire, 2016

The EPA reports:

Warmer air tends to have more water vapor, so more water can be potentially released in a storm. During the last 50 years, the amount of rain falling during the wettest four days of the year has increased about 15 percent in the Great Plains. Over the next several decades, heavy downpours will account for an increasing fraction of all precipitation. Larger river flows and more intense rainstorms would each increase the risk of flooding. Scientists do not know how the frequency and severity of tornadoes will change. Rising concentrations of greenhouse gases tend to increase humidity, and thus atmospheric instability, which would encourage tornadoes. But wind shear is likely to decrease, which would discourage tornadoes. Research is ongoing to learn whether tornadoes will be more or less frequent in the future".

== Invasive species ==
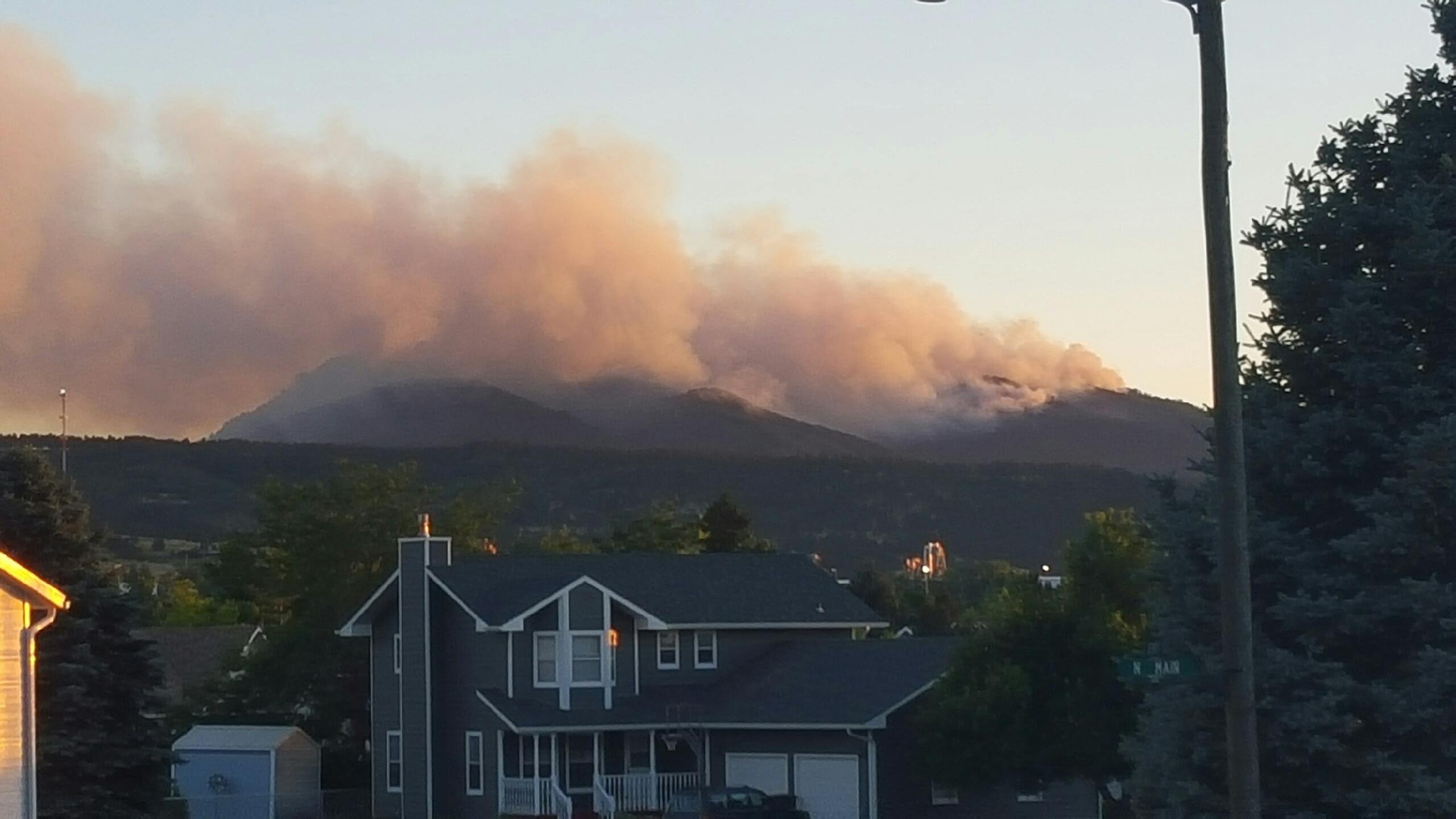
Air pollution from wildfire smoke near Spearfish, 2016.

One invasive species that will dominate South Dakotas eastern woodlands due to climate change is buckthorn. Buckthorn requires adequate precipitation and eastern South Dakota may receive more rainfall due to climate change. Wildlife also consume buckthorn's seeds which help spread the plant into new areas. This tree species is not native to the area and spreads drastically into open areas. Removing buckthorn is very costly and time consuming. The only way to remove the tree is to either pull it out of the ground or cut and spray it with a herbicide.

== Agriculture ==
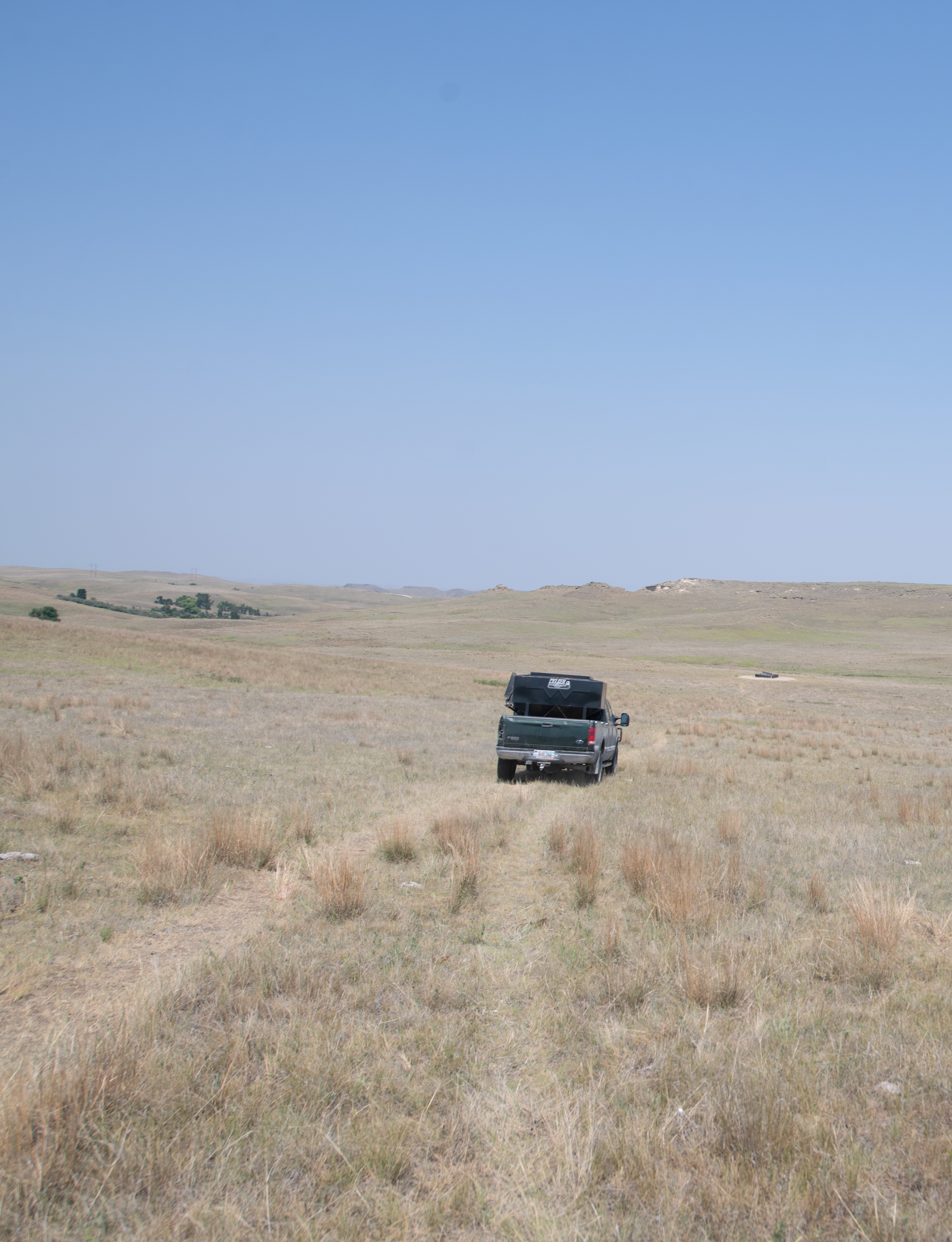
Drought, Stoneville, 2021

"Rising temperatures and changes in rainfall are likely to have both negative and positive effects on South Dakota’s farms and ranches. Hot weather causes cows to eat less and grow more slowly, and it can threaten their health. Increased winter and spring precipitation could leave some fields too wet to plant, and warmer winters may promote the growth of weeds and pests. During drought years, hotter summers will dry the soil. Within 70 years, the frequency of days above 100°F is likely to double. Even where ample water is available, higher temperatures would reduce yields of corn in the warmest parts of the state".

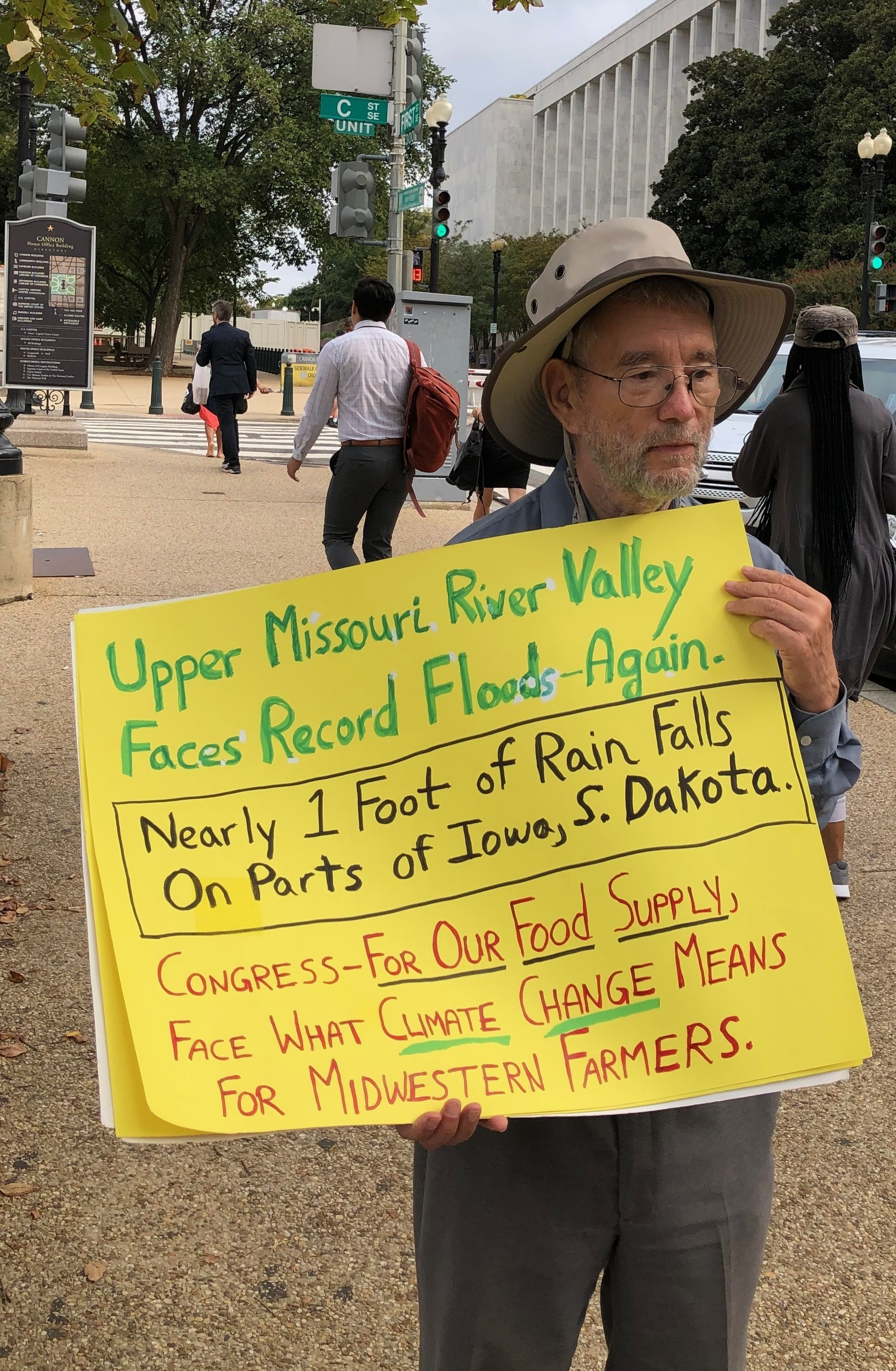
Protest against South Dakota floods, US Capitol, 2019.

"The overall yield of corn, however, is likely to increase in cooler parts of the Great Plains. Although higher temperatures would reduce yields of wheat and soybeans, increased concentrations of carbon dioxide are likely to increase yields enough to offset the impact of higher temperatures. Increased precipitation at the beginning of the growing season could also benefit some crops. Warmer and shorter winters may allow for a longer growing season, which could allow two crops per year instead of one in some instances. Warmer winters may also benefit cattle, offsetting some of the harm from hotter summers: during the winter of 1996–1997, for example, high winds and heavy snow killed half of the newborn calves and 100,000 adult cows in the northern Great Plains".

From 2005 to 2016, South Dakota was one of nine states to see an increase in energy-related carbon dioxide emissions. However in 2016, South Dakota was ranked 44 out of the 50 in the total amount of carbon dioxide emissions it released that year.

== Forests ==
"Longer growing seasons and increased carbon dioxide concentrations could increase the productivity of forests. Although forests generally benefit from higher productivity, warmer conditions make forests more susceptible to pests. Temperature controls the life cycle and winter mortality rates of pests such as bark beetles, which have infested and killed trees in the Black Hills in recent decades. With higher winter temperatures, some pests can persist year-round, and new pests and diseases may become established".

== See also ==
- Climate of South Dakota
- Plug-in electric vehicles in South Dakota
- Renewable energy in South Dakota
- Wind power in South Dakota
- Solar power in South Dakota
