= James Dehlsen =

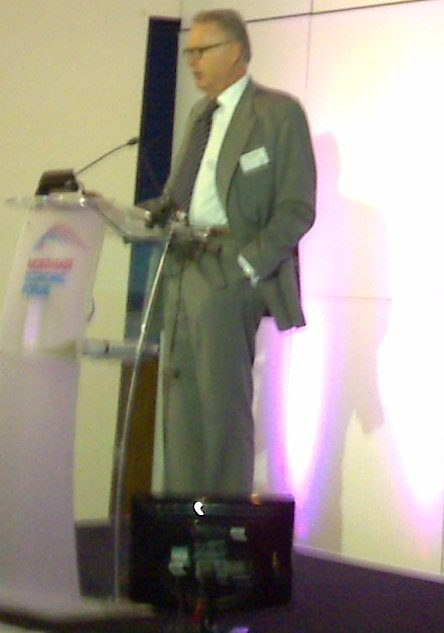
- Dehlsen in 2010
- Born: April 27, 1937 (age 89); Guadalajara, Mexico
- Education: University of Southern California (BS, MBA)
- Known for: Pioneer in wind power and renewable energy innovation in the U.S.

James G.P. Dehlsen (born April 27, 1937) is an American businessman, inventor, and entrepreneur. He is a pioneering figure in wind power and renewable energy development in the United States and holds 25 patents.

== Early life and career ==
Dehlsen was born in Guadalajara, Mexico. His father was a Danish businessman and engineer who worked for Southern Pacific Railroad. As a young man, he served in the U.S. Air Force. Dehlsen subsequently earned a BS and MBA from the University of Southern California.

Dehlsen developed a fluid lubricant called Tri-Flon which utilized micron-sized Teflon particles. He sold the company in 1980.

== Windpower and renewable energy career ==
=== Zond ===
In 1980, Dehlsen founded the wind power company Zond Systems Inc., which became the first company to commercially provide wind power to Southern California Edison.

Dehlsen collaborated with the Danish company Vestas, from which Zond purchased wind turbines. During the 1980s, Zond purchased nearly all the turbines Vestas produced. As a result, "California became the birthplace of the modern wind industry."

In the 1990s, Zond began manufacturing its own wind turbines in order further lower the cost of energy. With support from the National Renewable Energy Laboratory (NREL) and the U.S. Department of Energy, Zond produced a 550kW turbine. Zond's work on variable-speed technology subsequently enabled turbine scaling to 1.5MW.

In 1997, Enron acquired Zond and formed Enron Wind. GE subsequently acquired Enron Wind in 2002 to form GE Wind Energy.

=== Clipper Windpower ===
In 2001, Dehlsen and his son James Brenton ("Brent") established Clipper Windpower. In partnership with the U.S. Department of Energy and NREL, the company developed the 2.5-MW Liberty Wind Turbine, featuring advanced drive train and controls architecture. Commercial sales for the Liberty Wind Turbine began in 2006, then the largest wind turbine manufactured in the United States. Clipper's IPO on the Alternative Investment Market (AIM) of the London Stock Exchange launched in September 2005.

In 2007, the U.S. Department of Energy bestowed on Clipper its "Outstanding Research and Development Partnership Award" for its "outstanding contribution toward industry advancements," including attaining "unparalleled levels of efficiency and reliability and reduced cost of energy" with the Liberty Wind Turbine.

Clipper also worked on developing offshore wind power. In 2007, the company began design and development of the 10MW, 150m rotor "Britannia" offshore wind turbine in the United Kingdom.

In December 2009, United Technologies Corporation (UTC) announced it was acquiring a 49.5% stake in Clipper Windpower. By December 2010, UTC had acquired the rest of the company.

=== Aquantis ===
Dehlsen has worked on developing marine renewable energy. In 2011, he established Aquantis, which has developed underwater turbine technology to harness marine currents for utility-scale electric power generation. The company is headquartered in Santa Barbara, California. Aquantis has received U.S. Department of Energy grants and venture capital from Mitsubishi Heavy Industries. Dehlsen is also developing wave energy electric generators through his "Centipod" program.

== Awards and recognition ==
- 1985: The Danish Medal of Honor conferred by His Royal Highness, Prince Henrik
- 1989: Dehlsen testified before the United States Senate Committee on Energy and Natural Resources in a hearing entitled, "Global Warming and Its Implications for California."
- 1997: Dehlsen was part of a wind energy delegation that attended the third United Nations Climate Change conference in Kyoto, Japan.
- 1998: Dehlsen established and endowed the Dehlsen Chair Environmental Studies at the University of California, Santa Barbara.
- 2000: American Wind Energy Association Lifetime Achievement Award
- 2008: inducted into the National Environmental Hall of Fame as the "Father of Wind Energy in the U.S."
- 2009: Dehlsen testified before the United States House Energy Subcommittee on Energy and Environment in a hearing entitled, "Marine and Hydrokinetic Energy Technology: Finding the Path to Commercialization."
- 2013: Dehlsen named Power Engineering’s Top 10 Most Influential People Over the Past 25 Years
