= Wind power in South Dakota =

Electricity from wind in one U.S. state

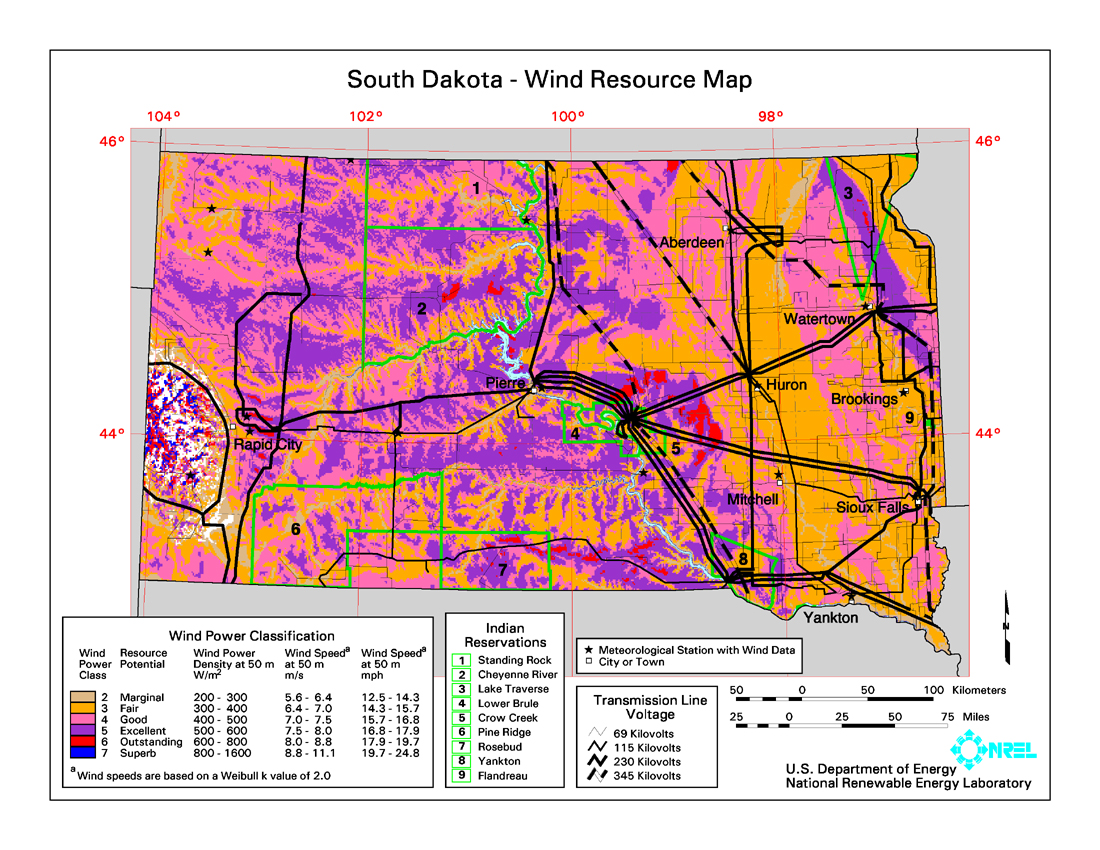
Wind resource map of South Dakota

The state of South Dakota is a leader in the U.S. in wind power generation with over 30% of the state's electricity generation coming from wind in 2017. In 2016, South Dakota had 583 turbines with a total capacity of 977 megawatts (MW) of wind generation capacity. In 2019, the capacity increased to 1525 MW.

South Dakota is one of the country's windiest states, and has the potential of installing 882,000 MW, and generating 2,902 billion kWh/year. Just as in Texas, the construction of new wind farms is transmission line limited.

== History ==
South Dakota's first wind farm was the South Dakota Wind Energy Center, built in 2003.

In 2018, 324-foot wind turbines were installed in South Dakota, with a capacity of 2,300 kilowatts.

"As of December 2018, South Dakota had 1,018 megawatts of wind power capacity online and running. Another 200 megawatts of wind energy was under construction, and 673 more megawatts spread across dozens of sites are permitted for production."

== Summary statistics ==
Wind generation percentage	Wind power per capita	Wind power capacity density

South Dakota wind generating capacity by year
Megawatts of generating capacity

South Dakota wind generation by year
Million kilowatt-hours of electricity

== List of wind farms in South Dakota ==
Wind power projects in South Dakota
Operating
Under construction
Proposed

See also list of farms from the South Dakota Public Utilities Commission.

Name	Location	Coordinates	Capacity (MW)	Number of turbines	Owner	Year opened	Ref
Aurora County Wind	Aurora County		20	9	Con Ed	2018	
Beethoven Wind	Bon Homme County		80	43	Northwestern Energy	2015	
Brule County Wind	Brule County		20	9	Con Ed	2018	
Buffalo Ridge Wind	Brookings County		260	129	Avangrid	2009/2010	
Campbell County Wind	Campbell County		97.8	56	Con Ed	2015	
Chamberlain Wind	Brule County		2.6	2	Basin Electric Coop	2002	
Coyote Ridge Wind	Brookings County		98	38	WEP Energy Group	2019	
Crocker Wind	Clark County		200	77	Geronimo Energy	2019	
Crowned Ridge Wind	Codington County; Grant County		200	87	NextEra Energy	2019	
Day County Wind	Day County		99	66	Nextera Energy	2019	
MinnDakota Wind	Brookings County		54	36	Avangrid	2008	
Oak Tree Wind	Clark County		19.5	11	Con Ed	2014	
Prairie Winds	Jerauld County; Aurora County; Brule County		162	101	Basin Electric Coop	2011	
Prevailing Wind Park	Bon Homme County; Charles Mix County; Coddington County		219.6	57	S-Power	2020	
South Dakota Wind Energy Center	Hyde County		40.5	27	NextEra Energy	2003	
Tatanka Wind Farm	McPherson County		190 (88.5 in SD)	179 (59 in SD)	Acciona	2008	
Tatanka Ridge Wind Farm	Deuel County		154.8	56	WEC Energy Group; Avangrid	2021	
Titan Wind Project (Rolling Thunder Wind)	Hand County		25	10	American Electric Power	2009	
Triple H Wind Project	Hyde County		250	92	ENGIE US	2020	
Wessington Springs Wind	Jeraud County		51	34	NextEra Energy	2009	
Willow Creek Wind	Hand County		103	38	Ørsted	2020	

== Wind generation ==
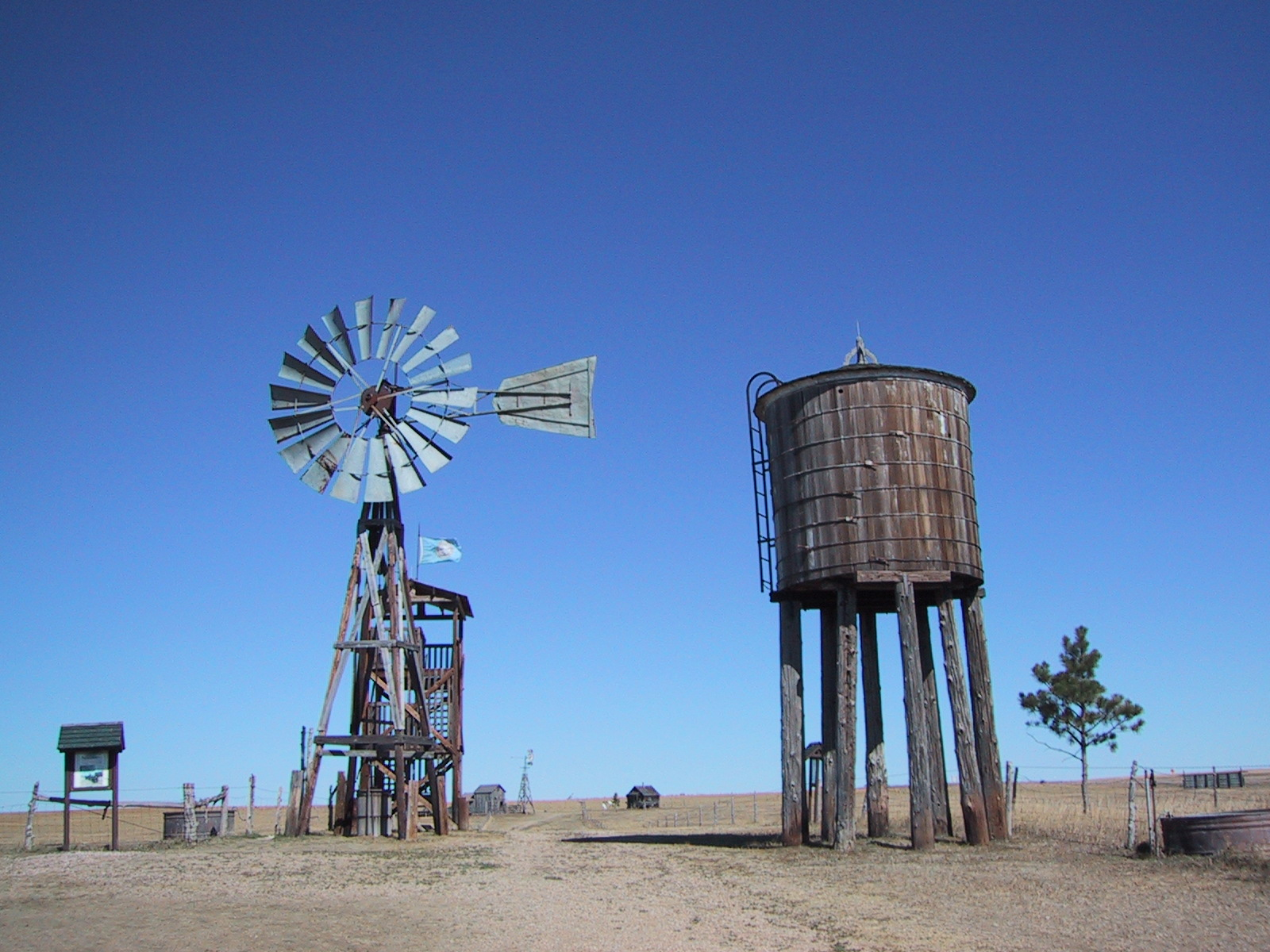
All across the midwest, the Aermotor Windmill and others like it, have been used for pumping water for a century.

South Dakota wind generation (GWh, million kWh)
Year	Total	Jan	Feb	Mar	Apr	May	Jun	Jul	Aug	Sept	Oct	Nov	Dec
2002	4	0	1	0	1	1	0	0	0	0	0	1	0
2003	43	0	0	1	1	1	0	0	0	0	10	14	16
2004	158	13	15	16	13	15	9	9	11	14	15	13	15
2005	159	12	10	13	17	16	13	12	10	14	13	14	15
2006	147	12	12	16	13	14	9	10	11	11	13	12	14
2007	151	16	11	14	12	15	12	10	9	15	14	13	10
2008	146	11	9	10	14	12	9	8	8	10	14	15	26
2009	420	17	25	25	53	45	25	27	33	37	43	41	49
2010	1,371	84	60	99	130	150	102	97	119	132	130	134	134
2011	2,668	183	264	234	263	283	208	149	157	142	253	275	257
2012	2,354	232	182	234	231	218	187	153	145	162	234	206	170
2013	2,688	260	213	230	272	236	201	157	150	202	256	284	227
2014	2,336	258	200	216	221	192	150	155	101	185	217	250	191
2015	2,498	244	193	226	235	213	158	159	185	207	245	251	182
2016	3,714	274	299	338	383	280	288	235	222	305	334	342	414
2017	2,957	252	273	304	285	258	223	161	133	224	295	266	283
2018	2,837	289	238	280	268	204	245	143	182	230	240	244	274
2019	2,789	222	189	257	260	211	180	183	150	247	275	295	320
2020	5,545	337	433	477	424	415	442	337	410	467	532	591	680
2021	9,322	673	583	934	897	786	660	619	793	777	820	896	884
2022	10,325	917	967	1,089	1,070	711	715	683	661	756	919	991	846
2023	2,696	778	996	922									

South Dakota wind generation in 2011 and 2012

== See also ==
- Solar power in South Dakota
- Renewable energy in South Dakota
- Wind power in the United States
- Renewable energy in the United States
