= List of power stations in South Dakota =

Sources of South Dakota utility-scale electricity generation in gigawatt-hours, full-year 2025:
1. Wind: 12,681 (57.2%)
2. Hydroelectric: 4,868 (22.0%)
3. Natural gas: 2,141 (9.66%)
4. Coal: 2,026 (9.14%)
5. Solar: 437 (1.97%)
6. Biomass: 18 (0.08%)

This is a list of electricity-generating power stations in the U.S. state of South Dakota. In 2024, South Dakota had a total summer capacity of 7.2 GW through all of its power plants, and a net generation of 20,871 GWh. In 2025, the electrical energy generation mix was 57.2% wind, 22% hydroelectric, 9.7% natural gas, 9.1% coal, 2% solar, and 0.1% biomass.

During 2021, South Dakota was among the top U.S. states in its share of renewable electricity generation. It was also among the top states in per-capita consumption. In recent years, more electricity was consumed than was produced and wind generation has been expanding rapidly in the state.

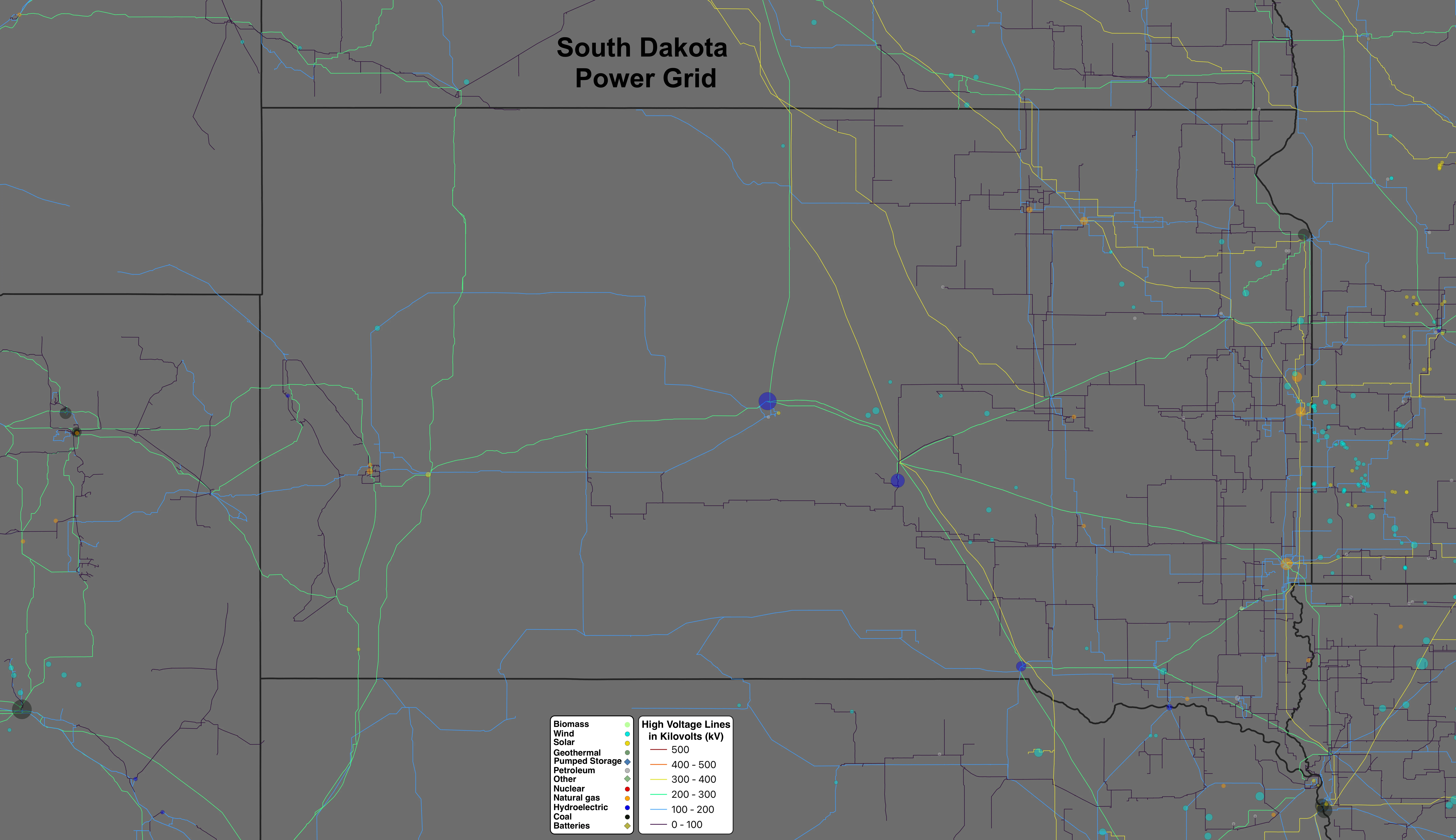
South Dakota power grid

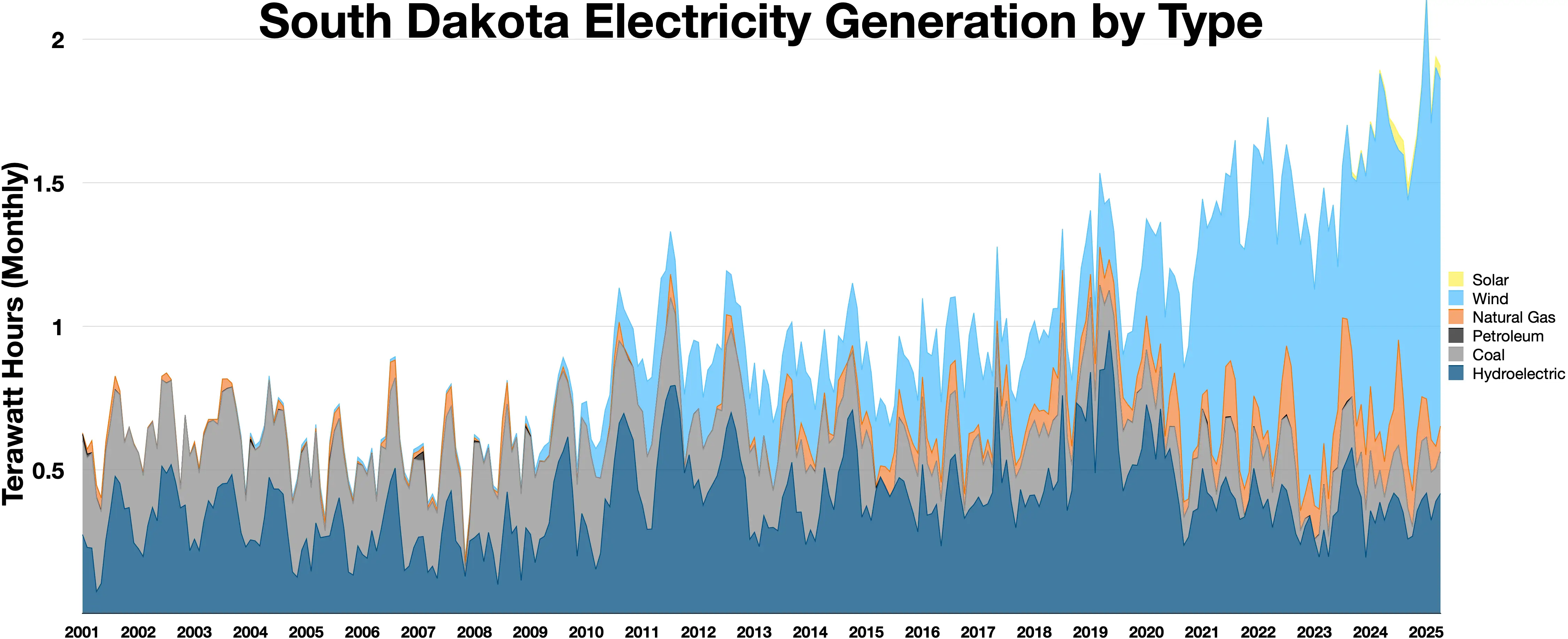
South Dakota electricity generation by type

== Nuclear power stations ==
The Pathfinder Nuclear Generating Station was an early commercial and demonstration plant near Sioux Falls that generated up to 59 MW of grid-connected electricity for brief periods during years 1966–1967. The single BWR reactor was decommissioned in 1967, the facility converted to use oil and gas in 1968, and ultimately retired in the early 2000s. The reactor and other nuclear components were removed in 1990. South Dakota had no utility-scale plants that used fissile material as a fuel in 2019.

== Fossil-fuel power stations ==
Data from the U.S. Energy Information Administration serves as a general reference.

=== Coal ===
Plant	Location	Coordinates	Capacity (MW)	Owner	Year opened	Scheduled retirement	Ref
Ben French	Pennington County	44°05′14″N 103°15′40″W	25	Black Hills Corp	1961	2014	
Big Stone	Grant County	45°18′13″N 96°30′36″W	475	Otter Tail	1975	TBD	

=== Natural gas ===
Plant	Location	Coordinates	Capacity (MW)	Generation type	Owner	Year opened	Ref
Aberdeen	Brown County	45°25′48″N 98°29′38″W	52	Simple cycle	Northwestern Energy	2013	
Angus Anson	Minnehaha County	43°36′13″N 96°38′08″W	327	Simple cycle (x3)	Northwestern Energy	1994/2005	
Ben French	Pennington County	44°05′14″N 103°15′40″W	68	Simple cycle (x4)	Black Hills Corp	1965/1994/2005	
Deer Creek Station	Brookings County	44°17′27″N 96°31′36″W	295	1x1 combined cycle	Basin Electric Power Coop	2012	
Groton Generating Station	Brown County	45°22′25″N 98°05′55″W	169	Simple cycle (x2)	Basin Electric Power Coop	2006/2008	
Huron	Beadle County	44°22′10″N 98°10′20″W	55	Simple cycle (x2)	Northwestern Energy	1961/1991	
Lange GT	Pennington County	44°07′13″N 103°15′36″W	34	Simple cycle	Black Hills Corp	2002	
OREG Clark	Clark County		5.5^{[A]}	ORC generator	Basin Electric Power Coop / Ormat	2006	
OREG Estelline	Hamlin County		5.5^{[A]}	ORC generator	Basin Electric Power Coop / Ormat	2007	
OREG Wetonka	McPherson County		5.5^{[A]}	ORC generator	Basin Electric Power Coop / Ormat	2006	
POET Biorefining - Hudson	Lincoln County	43°05′49″N 96°28′37″W	3.6	Steam turbine	POET LLC	2019	
Yankton	Yankton County	42°53′36″N 97°21′12″W	8.7	Reciprocating engine (x2)	Northwestern Energy	1963/1974/1975	

^{A} Waste heat recovery from natural-gas-fired turbines at compressor stations on the Northern Border Pipeline.

=== Petroleum ===
Plant	Location	Coordinates	Capacity (MW)	Generation type	Owner	Year opened	Ref
Aberdeen	Brown County	45°25′48″N 98°29′38″W	20.5	Simple cycle	Northwestern Energy	1978	
Ben French	Pennington County	44°05′14″N 103°15′40″W	10	Reciprocating engine (x5)	Black Hills Corp	1965/1994/2005	
Clark	Clark County	44°52′35″N 97°43′56″W	2.6	Reciprocating engine	Northwestern Energy	1970	
Faulkton	Faulk County	45°02′12″N 99°07′13″W	2.5	Reciprocating engine	Northwestern Energy	1969	
Fort Pierre	Stanley County	44°22′05″N 100°22′51″W	6	Reciprocating engine (x3)	City of Ft. Pierre	2004	
Lake Preston	Kingsbury County	44°21′54″N 97°22′52″W	20	Simple cycle	Otter Tail	1978	
Watertown Power Plant	Codington County	44°54′06″N 97°06′30″W	50	Simple cycle	Missouri Basin Mun Pwr	1978	
Yankton	Yankton County	42°53′36″N 97°21′12″W	4.8	Reciprocating engine (x2)	Northwestern Energy	1963/1974/1975	

== Renewable power stations ==
Data from the U.S. Energy Information Administration serves as a general reference.

=== Biomass ===
Plant	Location	Coordinates	Capacity (MW)	Generation type	Fuel type	Owner	Year opened	Ref
POET Biorefining - Chancellor	Turner County	43°22′14″N 96°57′35″W	5.4	Steam turbine	Wood/wood waste	POET LLC	2018	

=== Hydroelectric ===
Name	Location	Coordinates	Capacity (MW)	Number of turbines	Owner	Year opened	Ref
Big Bend Dam	Buffalo County	44°02′18″N 99°26′47″W	494.1	8	United States Army Corps of Engineers-Omaha District	1964-1966	
Fort Randall Dam	Charles Mix County	43°03′55″N 98°33′14″W	320	8	United States Army Corps of Engineers-Omaha District	1954-1956	
Gavins Point Dam	Yankton County	42°50′56″N 97°28′53″W	132	3	United States Army Corps of Engineers-Omaha District	1956-1957	
Oahe Dam	Hughes County	44°27′01″N 100°23′12″W	784	7	United States Army Corps of Engineers-Omaha District	1962-1963	
Spearfish Hydro	Lawrence County	44°28′42″N 103°51′17″W	4	2	City of Spearfish	1912	

Former facilities:

- Johnson Siding Dam - decommissioned 1930's

=== Solar ===
Plant	Location	Coordinates	Capacity (MW_{AC})	Owner	Year opened	Ref
Pierre Solar	Hughes County	44°23′20″N 100°18′25″W	1.0	Geronimo Energy; City of Pierre	2016	

=== Wind ===
See also list of farms from the South Dakota Public Utilities Commission.

Name	Location	Coordinates	Capacity (MW)	Number of turbines	Owner	Year opened	Ref
Aurora County Wind	Aurora County	43°43′08″N 98°45′07″W	20	9	Con Ed	2018	
Beethoven Wind	Bon Homme County	43°09′36″N 98°04′48″W	80	43	Northwestern Energy	2015	
Brule County Wind	Brule County	43°43′01″N 98°55′19″W	20	9	Con Ed	2018	
Buffalo Ridge Wind	Brookings County	44°31′41″N 96°37′36″W	260	129	Avangrid	2009/2010	
Campbell County Wind	Campbell County	45°45′12″N 100°16′30″W	97.8	56	Con Ed	2015	
Chamberlain Wind	Brule County	43°50′55″N 99°14′51″W	2.6	2	Basin Electric Coop	2002	
Coyote Ridge Wind	Brookings County	44°27′00″N 96°33′00″W	98	38	WEP Energy Group	2019	
Crocker Wind	Clark County	45°03′05″N 97°49′35″W	200	77	Geronimo Energy	2019	
Crowned Ridge Wind	Codington County; Grant County	45°09′18″N 96°50′12″W	200	87	NextEra Energy	2019	
Day County Wind	Day County	45°12′54″N 97°54′20″W	99	66	Nextera Energy	2019	
MinnDakota Wind	Brookings County	44°16′00″N 96°20′40″W	54	36	Avangrid	2008	
Oak Tree Wind	Clark County	44°56′00″N 97°44′29″W	19.5	11	Con Ed	2014	
Prairie Winds	Jerauld County; Aurora County; Brule County	43°53′11″N 98°47′15″W	162	101	Basin Electric Coop	2011	
Prevailing Wind Park	Bon Homme County; Charles Mix County; Coddington County	43°02′20″N 97°31′34″W	219.6	57	S-Power	2020	
South Dakota Wind Energy Center	Hyde County	44°32′57″N 99°30′00″W	40.5	27	NextEra Energy	2003	
Tatanka Wind Farm	McPherson County	45°56′N 98°58′W	190 (88.5 in SD)	179 (59 in SD)	Acciona	2008	
Tatanka Ridge Wind Farm	Deuel County	44°35′31″N 96°34′34″W	154.8	56	WEC Energy Group; Avangrid	2021	
Titan Wind Project (Rolling Thunder Wind)	Hand County	44°28′40″N 99°08′02″W	25	10	American Electric Power	2009	
Triple H Wind Project	Hyde County	44°24′04″N 99°36′14″W	250	92	ENGIE US	2020	
Wessington Springs Wind	Jeraud County	44°00′09″N 98°35′27″W	51	34	NextEra Energy	2009	
Willow Creek Wind	Hand County	44°49′33″N 103°12′27″W	103	38	Ørsted	2020	

== Storage power stations ==
Data from the U.S. Energy Information Administration serves as a general reference.

=== Battery storage ===
Plant Name	Location	Coordinates	Discharge capacity (MW)	Storage capacity (MWh)	Owner/distributor	Year opened	Ref
Rolling Thunder Wind Hybrid	Hand County	44°28′40″N 99°08′02″W	0.21	0.84	AE Power Services	2018	

== HVDC converter stations ==
Project name	Location	Coordinates	Capacity (MW)	Voltage (kV)	Year opened	Ref
Rapid City B2B Converter Station	Pennington County	44°00′37″N 103°09′54″W	200	13	2003	
