= Solar power in South Dakota =

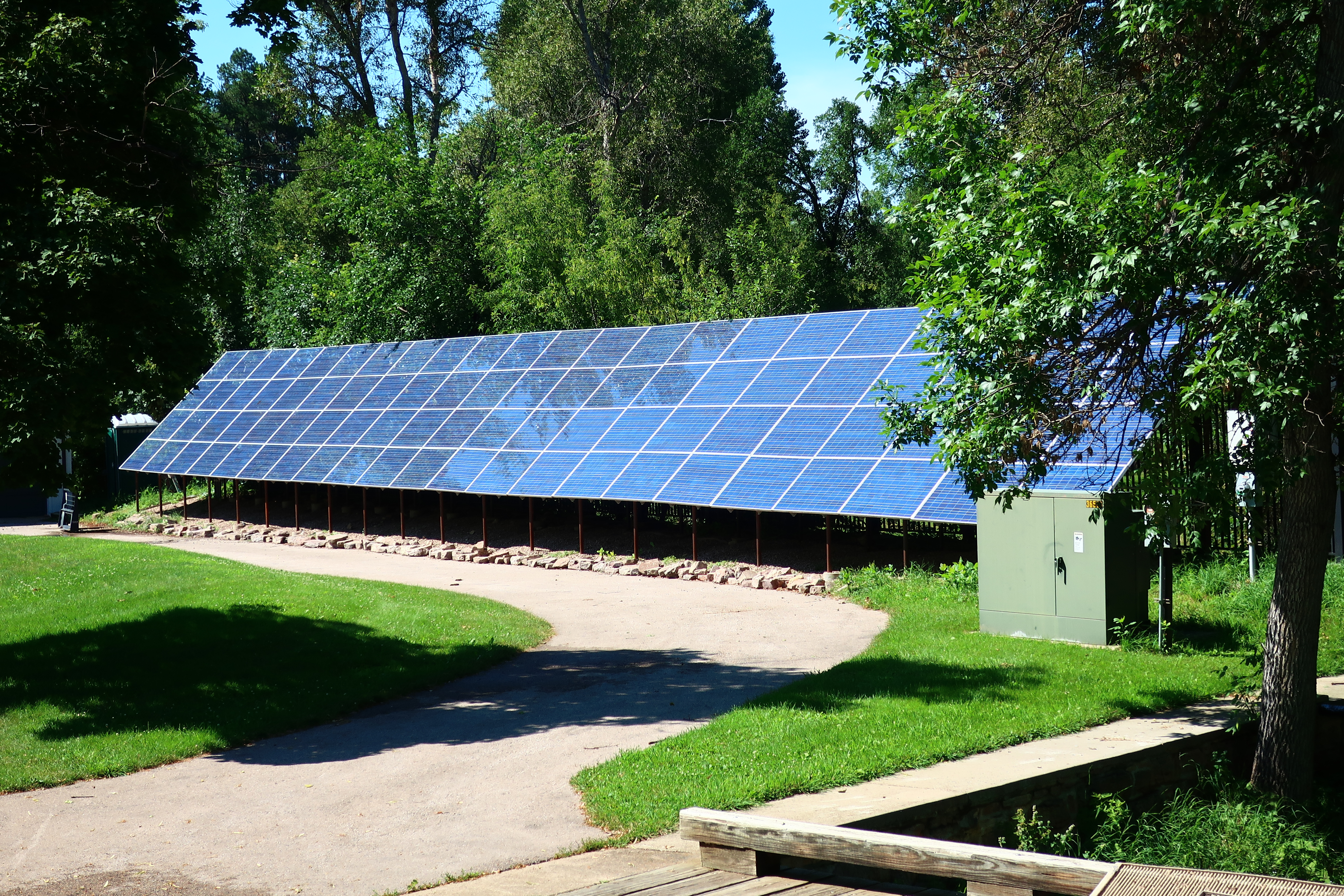
Solar installation, Spearfish

Solar power in South Dakota has high potential but little practical application. The state ranked 50th among U.S. states in installed solar polar in 2015 with no utility-scale or large commercial systems. Photovoltaic panels on rooftops can provide 38.7% of all electricity used in South Dakota using 3,800 MW of solar panels. The state is ranked 14th in the country in solar power potential, and 4th in wind potential.

Offering net metering is required by federal law, but South Dakota is one of only four states to not have adopted a statewide policy on net metering, which means it needs to be negotiated with the utility.

A solar project in Pierre was expected to be online in 2017. It was to cost $2 million and cover 5 acres.

== Statistics ==
Source: NREL

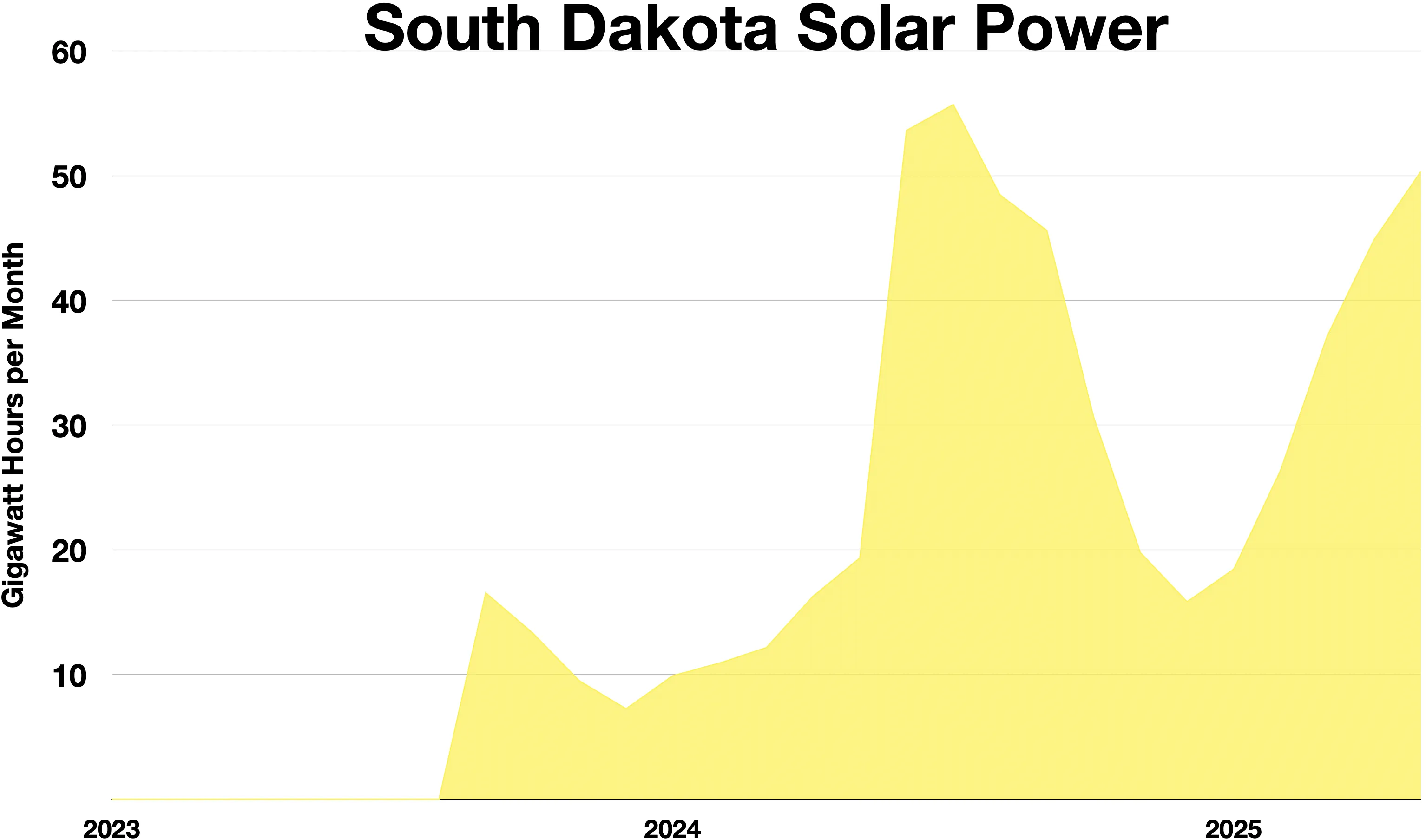
South Dakota solar power

Grid-connected PV capacity (MW)
Year	Capacity	Installed	% change
2010	<0.1		
2011	<0.1		
2012	<0.1		
2013	<0.1		
2014	0.22	0.21	
2015	0.24	0.02	9%
2016	1.34	1.1	458%
2017	1.36	0.02	1%
2018	1.39	0.03	2%
2019	1.44	0.05	4%
2020	1.8	0.36	25%
2021	2	0.2	%
2022	3	1	%

== See also ==
- List of power stations in South Dakota
- Wind power in South Dakota
- Renewable energy in South Dakota
- Solar power in the United States
