= Clipper Windpower =

US wind turbine manufacturing company

- Type: Subsidiary
- Industry: Renewable Power
- Founded: 2001; 25 years ago, State of Delaware
- Headquarters: Cedar Rapids, Iowa, United States
- Key people: Bob Loyd, CEO
- Products: Wind turbines
- Parent: Platinum Equity LLC
- Website: www.clipperwind.com

Clipper Windpower is a wind turbine manufacturing company founded in 2001 by James G.P. Dehlsen. It designed one of the largest wind turbines in the United States, manufactured in Cedar Rapids, Iowa. It was working collaboratively with the National Renewable Energy Laboratory.

Affected by a global recession, in December 2010 Clipper Windpower was acquired by United Technologies Corporation. It was sold in 2012 to Platinum Equity. The company has reduced its manufacturing and is supporting its turbines.

== History ==
In September 2007 Clipper Windpower, based in Carpinteria, California, received an Outstanding Research and Development Partnership Award from the U.S. Department of Energy (DOE) for the design and development of its 2.5 MW Liberty Wind Turbine, one of the largest wind turbines manufactured in the U.S. at the time. The turbine was developed under a partnership with DOE and its National Renewable Energy Laboratory (NREL). It was manufactured in Cedar Rapids, Iowa.

Commercial sales started in June 2006 for the new Liberty turbine and (mostly contingent) orders for more than 5,600 MW (2,240 units) for deliveries in 2007 through 2011 were booked. Clipper Windpower had an agreement with BP Energy to supply the 2.5 MW turbines for the proposed 5,050 MW Titan Wind Project in South Dakota. Among the projects completed with Clipper wind turbines is Steel Winds in Lackawanna, New York, south of Buffalo, where an urban wind farm was developed on part of a brownfield.

Clipper's wind turbine technology suffered from frequent gearbox failures and cracked blades. This resulted in numerous warranty claims and lawsuits which significantly eroded Clipper's balance sheet and ability to secure financing. As such, Clipper's wind turbines are no longer manufactured.

=== Acquisition by United Technologies ===
On December 10, 2009, Connecticut-based United Technologies Corporation announced that it would acquire a 49.5% stake in Clipper Windpower by purchasing 84.3 million new shares and 21.8 million shares from current shareholders for £126.5 million. Clipper said this equity purchase "will significantly strengthen its balance sheet and enable it to enhance its operations and pursue its strategic initiatives". On 18 October 2010, UTC agreed with Clipper to acquire the rest of the company, a transaction that was completed in December 2010 for a total cost of approximately $385 million.

On March 15, 2012, United Technologies announced their intent to sell Clipper Windpower. CFO Greg Hayes described their 2010 acquisition as a "mistake". United Technologies' sudden about-face is attributed to the fact that the windpower manufacturing company does not fit into their new aerospace-focused business model. In August 2012, United Technologies sold Clipper to private equity firm Platinum Equity.

== Offshore wind energy turbine ==
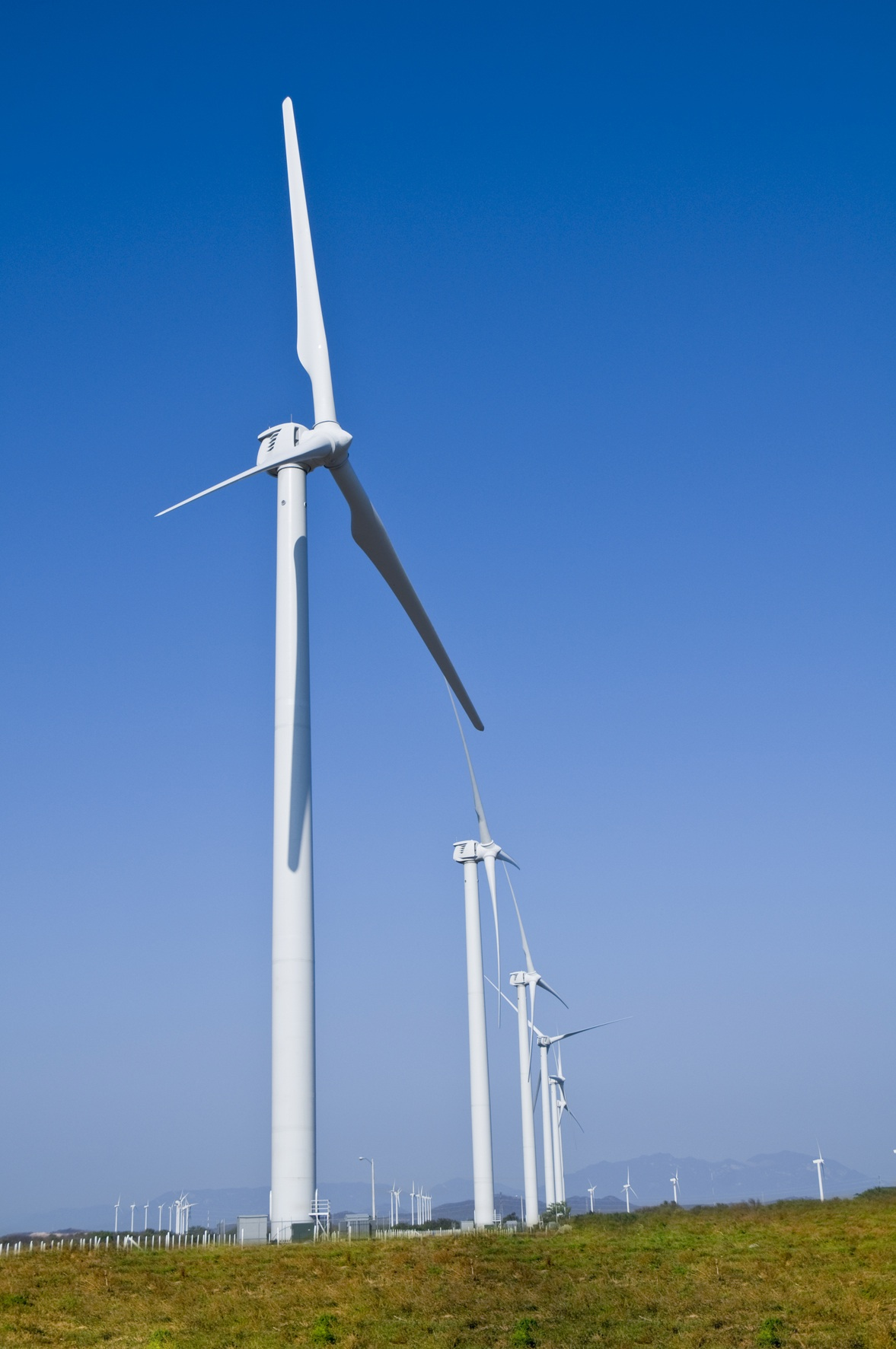
Clipper WindPower turbines installed at the Oaxaca I Lamatalaventosa Wind Farm in Mexico.

In April 2008 Clipper Windpower announced plans to develop a large wind energy turbine in Blyth, Northumberland in the United Kingdom. For use offshore, each turbine was designed to be rated at around 7.5 MW and would be roughly double the size of the largest turbines used in commercial offshore wind farms at that time (Siemens 3.6 MW turbine). According to the British Wind Energy Association, electrical power for a city the size of Newcastle upon Tyne could be supplied by as few as 20 of the turbines.

Clipper Windpower Marine had started construction of a 4,000 square metres (43,000 sq ft) offshore wind turbine blade manufacturing facility in Neptune Estate, Tyne in 2010. The factory would have been used to develop and build blades for the Britannia project, a 10 MW offshore wind turbine prototype under development by Clipper and scheduled for deployment in late 2012. However, Clipper stopped development of the 10 MW in August 2011 after parent United Technologies deemed the financial crisis as too severe, and paid £1.6 million of aid back to The Crown Estate.

== Other ==
The company discontinued manufacturing new turbines in Cedar Rapids in 2012. Its manufacturing facility in Cedar Rapids is devoted to replacement parts for its Liberty wind turbine, as it had problems with a Brazilian supplier.

A number of research labs are working to modify the Clipper wind turbine design. Navid Goudarzi and other investors have worked on a novel multiple-generator drivetrain that proposes employing different rated generators.
