= Dutch Hill/Cohocton Wind Farm =

Wind farm in New York, United States

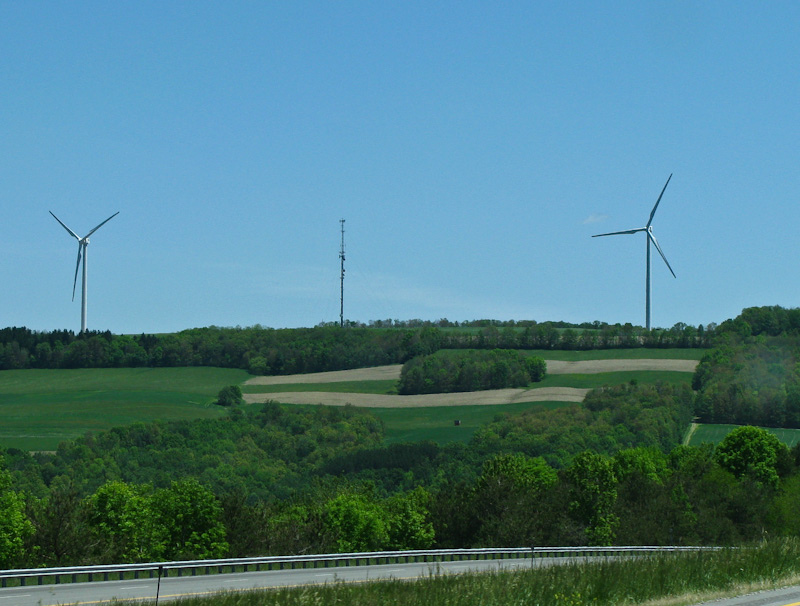
The turbines from Interstate 390

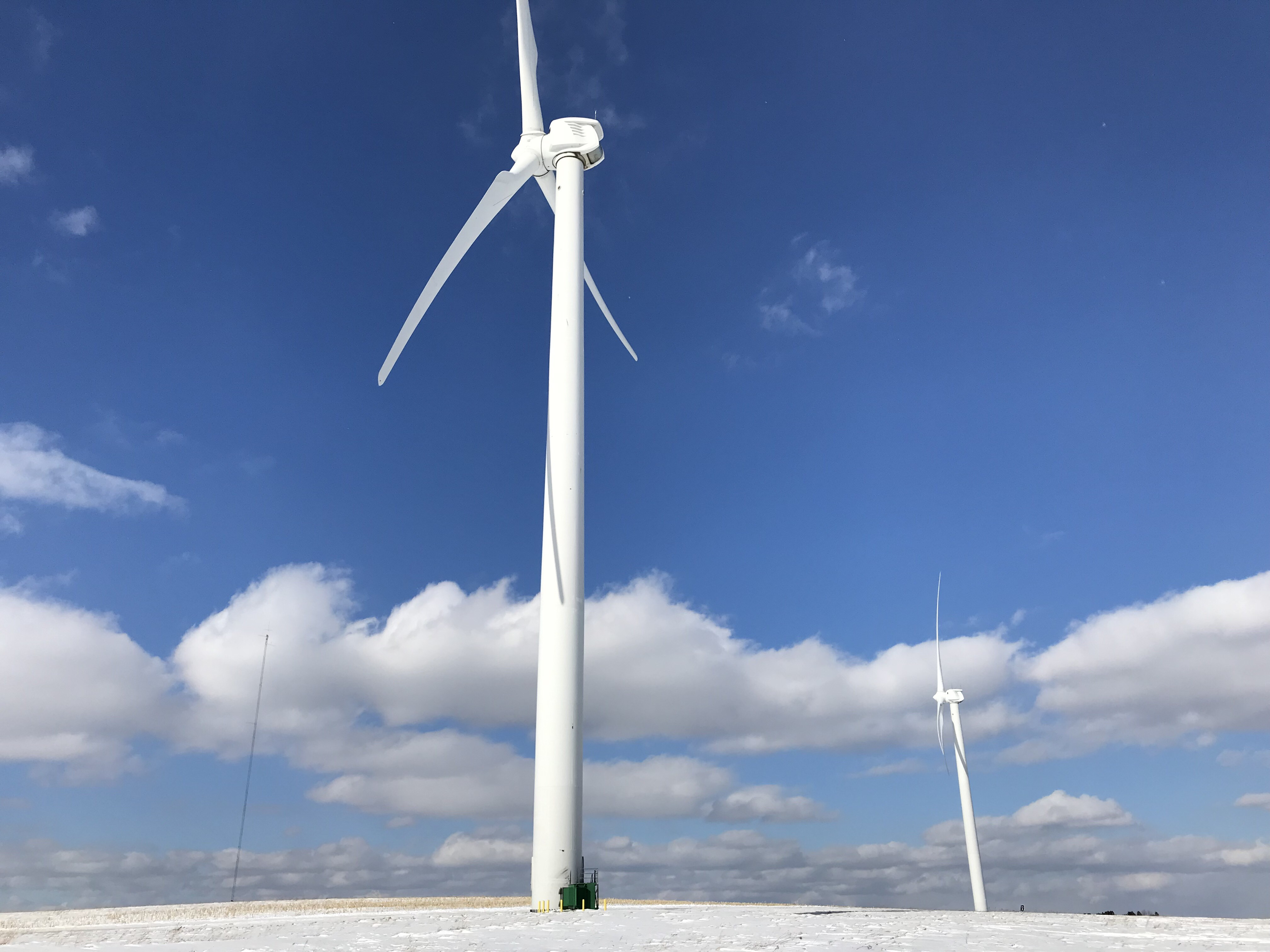
Two of the three southernmost turbines, and a permanent measurement mast

The Dutch Hill/Cohocton Wind Farm is a 125 Megawatt wind farm in Cohocton, New York. It uses 50 2.5 MW turbines of the Clipper "Liberty" type, which were the largest found in the United States when they were put up for sale.

== Overview ==
The wind farm provides power for about 50,000 Northeastern homes. The wind farm is located in Steuben County. It was installed in 2008 and was developed and operated by First Wind.

As of fall 2021, the 50 windmills are being replaced and should be complete by early 2022. They are being replaced because the Liberty windmill company went out of business and has no spare parts for maintenance.

== See also ==
- New York energy law
