= Renewable energy in South Dakota =

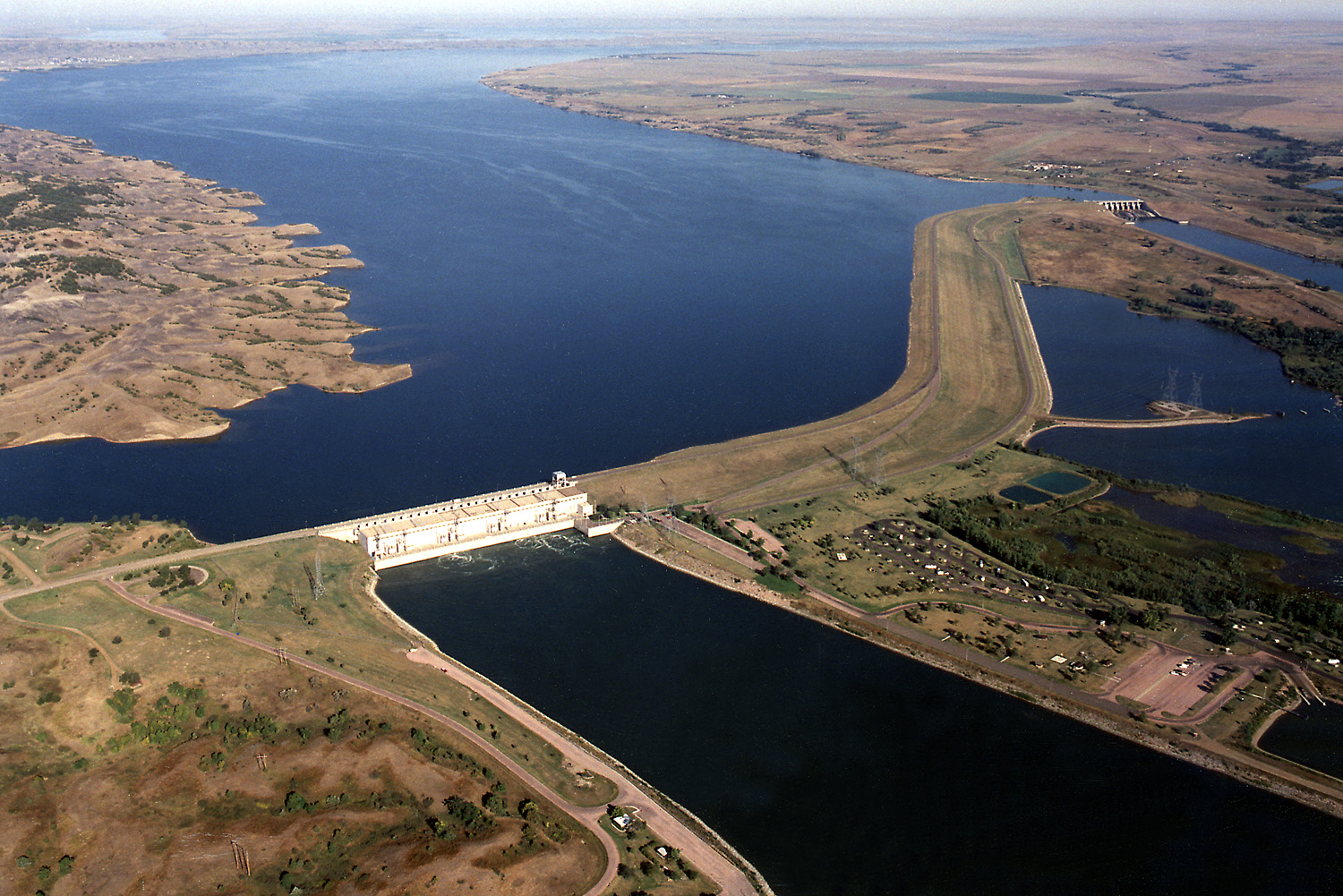
Big Bend Dam, Missouri River, South Dakota, USA

South Dakota Electricity Generation Sources

Renewable energy in South Dakota involves production of biofuels and generation of electricity from renewable sources of energy such as wind and hydropower. South Dakota is among the states with the highest percentage of electricity generation from renewable resources, typically over 70 percent. In 2011, South Dakota became the first U.S. state to have at least 20% of its electricity generation come from wind power, and by 2022, 84% of its generation was renewable (mostly wind power).

== Biofuel production ==
=== Ethanol fuel ===
Partially lying within the Corn Belt, South Dakota is a leading producer of ethanol fuel from corn. As of December, 2011, South Dakota had 15 ethanol plants with a combined production capacity of over 1 billion U.S. gallons (3.8 million cubic meters) annually. Sioux Falls is home to POET, one of the world's largest producers of ethanol. Ethanol plants in South Dakota used 291 million U.S. bushels (10.3 million cubic meters) of corn in 2009.

=== Biodiesel ===
South Dakota grows soybeans and other oil seed crops and has one biodiesel plant. Midwest Biodiesel Producers, located in Alexandria, is not in operation as of 2011 because the economics are not currently profitable.

A type of corn oil suitable for use as a feedstock to biodiesel plants is now being extracted from byproducts of ethanol fuel production at several of POET's plants.

== Electrical power generation ==
About 30 percent of South Dakota's electricity generation is from wind. The state was the first to achieve the 20% mark for full year generation.

=== Hydroelectric power ===
Four dams on the Missouri River generate the bulk of South Dakota's hydropower. Hydropower is the main source of electricity generation in South Dakota. These dams are Gavins Point Dam near Yankton, the Fort Randall Dam near Pickstown, the Big Bend Dam near Fort Thompson, and the Oahe Dam near Pierre. They have generating capacities of 44 MW, 320 MW, 293 MW, and 786 MW.

=== Wind power ===
Electricity generated from wind power constitutes about a quarter of total generation in South Dakota. South Dakota has 583 turbines with a total capacity of 977 megawatts (MW) of wind generation capacity. Although this is not a large capacity compared with other states, because little electrical power is generated in the state and the high capacity factor, this amount still allows South Dakota to be a leading state in terms of the percentage of electricity generation.

Estimates from the U.S. Department of Energy, EERE indicate that over 800,000 MW of wind capacity could be installed in South Dakota. Further expansion of wind power in the state is currently limited by lack of transmission capacity. A line from near Brookings to southeastern Minnesota, expected to be completed in 2015, should help alleviate the problem.

The capacity factor of South Dakota's wind turbine fleet reached 42.9 percent in 2012, this was the highest reported percentage in the country.

Titan Wind Project is a project with 25 MW of generating capacity, but has a proposed expansion to 5050 MW. The Tatanka Wind Farm is on the North Dakota border, with 88.5 MW in South Dakota.

=== Solar photovoltaic ===
As of the end of 2015, South Dakota had less than 250 kilowatts of grid connected photovoltaic capacity. The state is ranked 14th in the country in solar power potential.

=== Renewable portfolio standard ===
South Dakota legislation enacted a voluntary goal of 10% electrical generation from renewable energy sources by 2015.

== See also ==
- List of U.S. states by electricity production from renewable sources
