= Titan Wind Project =

Wind farm in South Dakota, United States

- Country: United States
- Location: Hand County, South Dakota
- Coordinates: 44°30′58″N 99°12′6″W
- Status: Phase I operating
- Commission date: Phase I: 2009
- Owner: BP Wind Energy

Power generation
- Units operational: 10 x 2.5 MW Liberty Wind Turbines
- Nameplate capacity: Phase I: 25 MW

The Titan Wind Project is 25MW wind farm which had a proposed expansion to 5,050 MW, formerly known as Rolling Thunder, based in South Dakota. The project developers, Clipper Windpower and BP Alternative Energy, expected to build Titan in several phases and, when completed, it would have been one of the largest wind farms in the world.

The complete wind farm would have used up to 2,020 of Clipper's Liberty 2.5 MW wind turbines. However, this is no longer planned, as Clipper Windpower has since ceased production of wind turbines due to financial problems and the potential capacity is double local demand.

== Planned capacity ==
Operating at full planned capacity, the proposed expansion would be able to supply the electricity for 100% of the households in the state several times over. South Dakota's entire electricity consumption in 2005 was 9.811 TWh. At an assumed capacity factor of 40% (roughly what is currently observed in South Dakota), a 5.05 GW nameplate capacity would correspond to an annual generation of 17.7 TWh.

== Phase I ==
Construction of phase I began in 2009 on a 7,500-acre (3,000 ha) site in Hand County in the Ree Hills south of Ree Heights. The project was complete by the end of the year. Phase I consists of 10 Liberty C89 2.5 MW wind turbines for a combined nameplate capacity of 25 MW. Northwestern Energy has a long-term power purchase agreement.

== Battery storage pilot project ==
As of 2018, BP is planning to use the project as a pilot for battery storage with Tesla.

== See also ==
- List of wind farms in the United States
- Wind power in South Dakota
- Wind power in the United States
