= Liberty Wind Turbine =

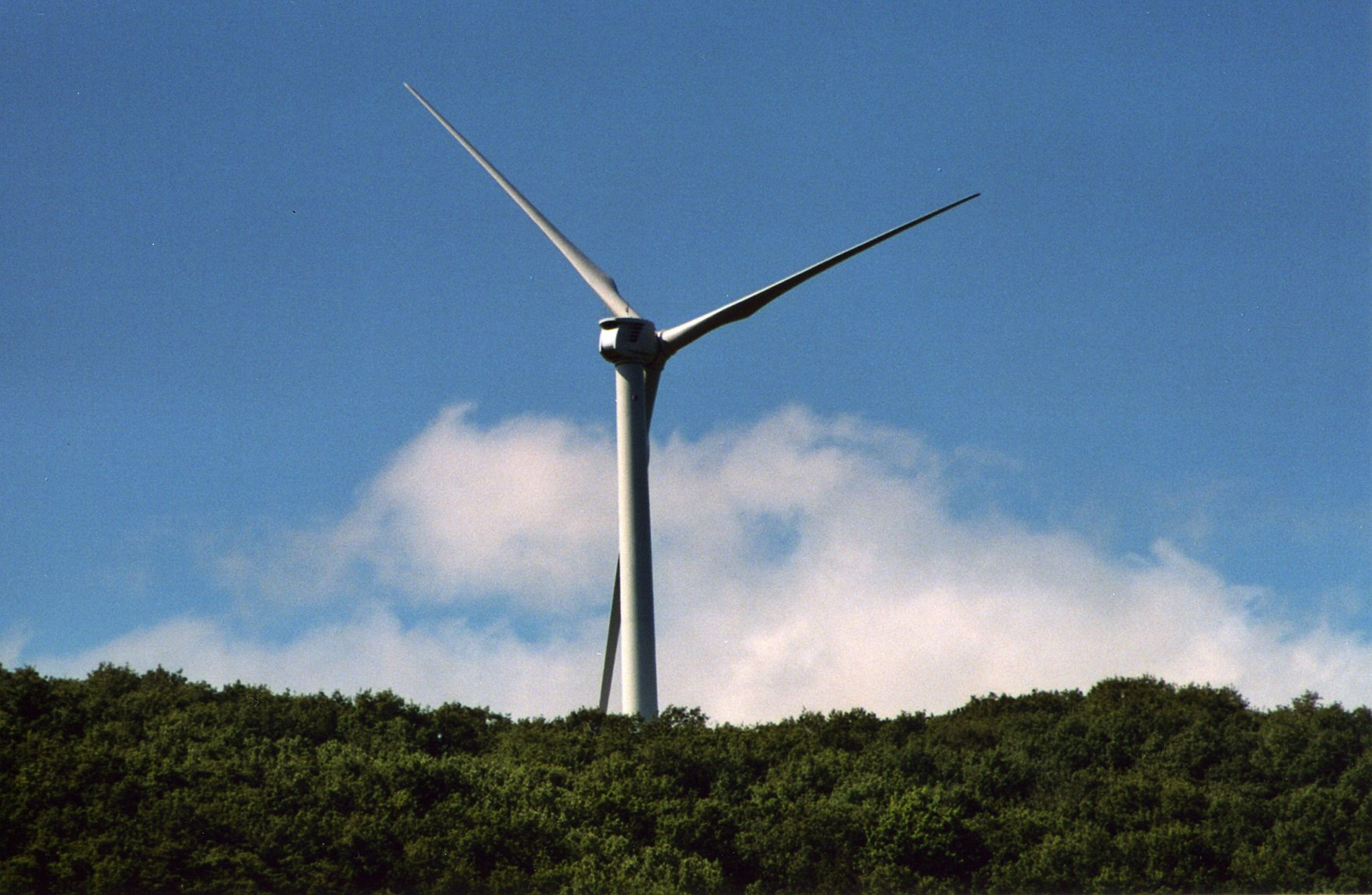
Liberty wind turbine in Dutch Hill Wind farm

The 2.5 MW Liberty Wind Turbine was the largest wind turbine manufactured in the United States when it was first installed in 2007. It was developed through a partnership with U.S. Department of Energy and its National Renewable Energy Laboratory for Clipper Windpower.

== History ==
The design of the turbine was meant to reduce problems with power train components that have been experienced in other machines. A two-ton crane within the nacelle simplifies maintenance thereby reducing costs. The size and weight of the Liberty allow it to be constructed with a crane of the same capacity as used with most 1.5 MW turbines.

Commercial sales for the new Liberty turbine started in June 2006. Liberty turbines were placed into service in the first quarter of 2007 at Steel Winds, a wind energy project located on the coast of Lake Erie in Lackawanna, New York, south of the City of Buffalo in Erie County. Sales stopped in 2012 as the model was experiencing problems with power train components that had cost the company hundreds of millions of dollars in warranty repairs.

== Technical characteristics ==
Liberty Wind Turbine uses an 80-meter-tall (260 ft) tower as a standard in its design. The rotor diameter varies amongst particular versions of turbines. The diameter for version C89 is 89 meters, 93 meters for version C93, 96 meters for version C96, and 99 meters for C99. Blade lengths are 43.2 m for C89, 45.2 m for C93, 46.7 m for C96 and 48.2 m for C100. Liberty Wind Turbines use 4 generators that have permanent magnets. Each generator delivers 660 kW at 1133 RPM at a voltage of 1350 Vdc.
