= Steel Winds =

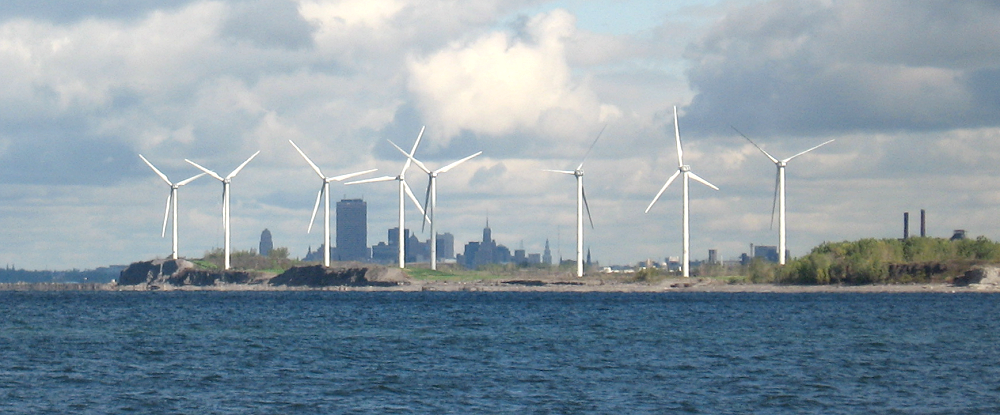
- Official name: Steel Winds I & Steel Winds II
- Country: United States
- Location: Lackawanna, New York
- Coordinates: 42°48′N 78°52′W
- Status: Operational
- Commission date: April 2007
- Construction cost: $40 Million
- Owner: First Wind

Wind farm
- Type: Onshore

Power generation
- Units operational: 14 x 2.5 MW
- Make and model: Clipper Windpower Liberty Series
- Nameplate capacity: 35 MW

External links
- Website: www.firstwind.com/projects/steel-winds-I
- Commons: Related media on Commons

Steel Winds (or Steel Winds I & Steel Winds II) is a wind energy project located on the coast of Lake Erie in Lackawanna, New York, just south of the City of Buffalo in Erie County. Its first phase was operational in 2007 and the second phase came online in 2012, for a combined production capacity of 35 MW. The unique project was built on part of the brownfield of a former Bethlehem Steel plant. By using much of the existing infrastructure of roads and transmission lines, it could reduce project costs. It is one of the largest urban wind farms in the world and uses turbines manufactured in Iowa.

== Background ==
According to the U.S. Department of Energy, wind farms are producing the fastest-growing energy source in the world. American wind farms generated an estimated 35,000 megawatts (MW) of wind energy in 2009, just over two percent of the U.S. electricity supply, powering the equivalent of nearly 10 million homes. Prior to this project, studies for solar power options at the site were extensively studied.

The Steel Winds project has been developed on 30 acres (12 ha) of the 1,600-acre (650 ha) brownfield remaining from the former Bethlehem Steel Plant. This facility, declining since 1983 and ending its coke production in 2001, is being returned to productive use under the New York Department of Environmental Conservation Brownfield Cleanup Program. EPA had completed sufficient cleanup of the Super Fund site by early 2006 to allow the next phase of the project to proceed under state supervision.

A 2002 change in environmental laws gave the city and developers immunity from the costs of remediating the site. Such associated costs had earlier stymied redevelopment of the planned 1,600-acre site for public use under the state's brownfield cleanup program. Brownfields are the remains of accumulated low-level toxic waste, which developed around factory operations. They were left when industry restructured, and factories were abandoned.

Norman Polanski, then mayor of Lackawanna, New York and a former worker at Bethlehem Steel, has supported this project. He believes it can help attract industry to the area, as well as tourism. The city and state are studying the possibility of manufacturing turbine equipment locally to revive local industry and reduce costs of future projects in New York.

== Description ==
The wind farm is designed to produce 35-MW of electricity, enough to power 16,000 homes in New York. Power is being sold into the NYS ISO grid for sale to retail customers. This is one of the largest urban wind power developments in the world, and its wind turbines are harnessing the power of the steady winds that blow from Lake Erie.

The project is owned by First Wind, which will be selling energy, capacity and RECs to energy retailer Constellation NewEnergy through 2009. The project was built by Tennessee Valley Infrastructure Group, of Chattanooga, Tennessee. It is operated by First Wind. Operation and maintenance services will be provided by Clipper Windpower, the manufacturer of the turbines, for the first five years.

As the project uses the old steel mill's roads and off-site transmission lines, it required little construction of new infrastructure, often the most expensive part of an industrial project. The initial phase of the project cost an estimated $40 million. A 2012 expansion added $25 million to $30 million to the project's overall price tag.

== Project history ==
Construction was divided into two phases. Phase I called for the installation of 8 turbines by 2007, while phase II called for the installation of an additional 6 turbines by 2012.

The turbine components for phase I were manufactured in 2006 at Clipper's facility in Cedar Rapids, Iowa. They were shipped overland to the project site in early 2007, constructed, and placed online in April 2007. This marked the first commercial deployment of the 2.5 MW (3,400 hp) Liberty Series turbines. Full commercial operations started June 5, 2007, with a capacity of 20 MW.

The second phase of the project became active on January 27, 2012. This phase completed the 14-turbine project, adding 15 MW, for a cumulative 35 MW of power.

In community action, First Wind has used the Steel Winds project to raise awareness and funds for research into breast cancer. For five years, one of the turbines was illuminated by a pink light for National Breast Cancer Awareness Month, which is in the month of October.

== Specifications ==
The project consists of 14 Clipper Windpower 2.5-MW Liberty series wind turbines, which represents the latest technology in the largest commercially viable form.

Clipper patented its Quantum Distributed Generation Drivetrain ("DGEN-Q") and the use of four unique permanent magnet generators. Grid integration is achieved through power factor regulation technology with ride-through capability. The 2.5 MW Liberty turbine installation can be accomplished with a crane sized for standard commercial 1.5 MW units.

== See also ==
- New York energy law
