= Tatanka Wind Farm =

Wind farm in the United States

Coordinates: 45°56′21″N 99°00′39″W

The 180 MW "Tatanka Wind Farm", is located in Dickey County and McIntosh County, North Dakota, and McPherson County, South Dakota. It is the largest wind farm in North and South Dakota and generates enough renewable energy to power more than 60,000 U.S. homes.

Tatanka Wind Farm is the first installation of Acciona's 1.5 MW wind turbines in the United States. Construction of the $381 million project began in April 2007. The plant went online on July 25, 2008.

== See also ==
- List of wind farms
