= Helen Monsch =

American home economist

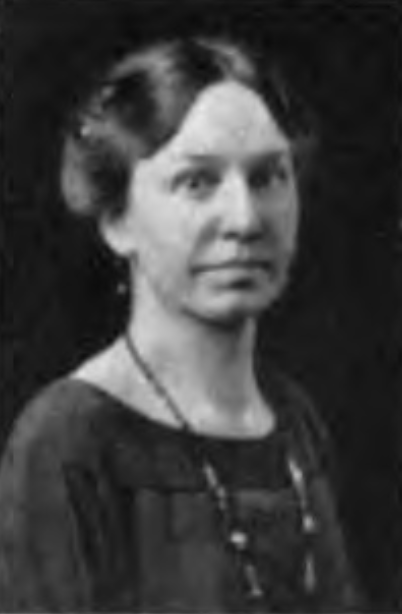
- Helen Monsch, from the 1927 yearbook of Cornell University
- Born: January 28, 1881; Louisville, Kentucky, U.S.
- Died: July 31, 1959 (age 78); Winter Park, Florida, U.S.
- Occupations: Home economist, college professor

Helen Monsch (January 28, 1881 – July 31, 1959) was an American home economist. Monsch was head of the food and nutrition department at Cornell University from 1925 to 1947.

== Early life and education ==
Monsch was born in Louisville, Kentucky, one of the ten children of Henry J. Monsch and Mary Elizabeth Braymen Monsch. She trained as a teacher in Kentucky; in 1904, she graduated from Kansas Agricultural College with a degree in home economics. She earned a second bachelor's degree in chemistry from the University of Chicago in 1909, and a master's degree in nutrition from Teachers College, Columbia University in 1916.

== Career ==
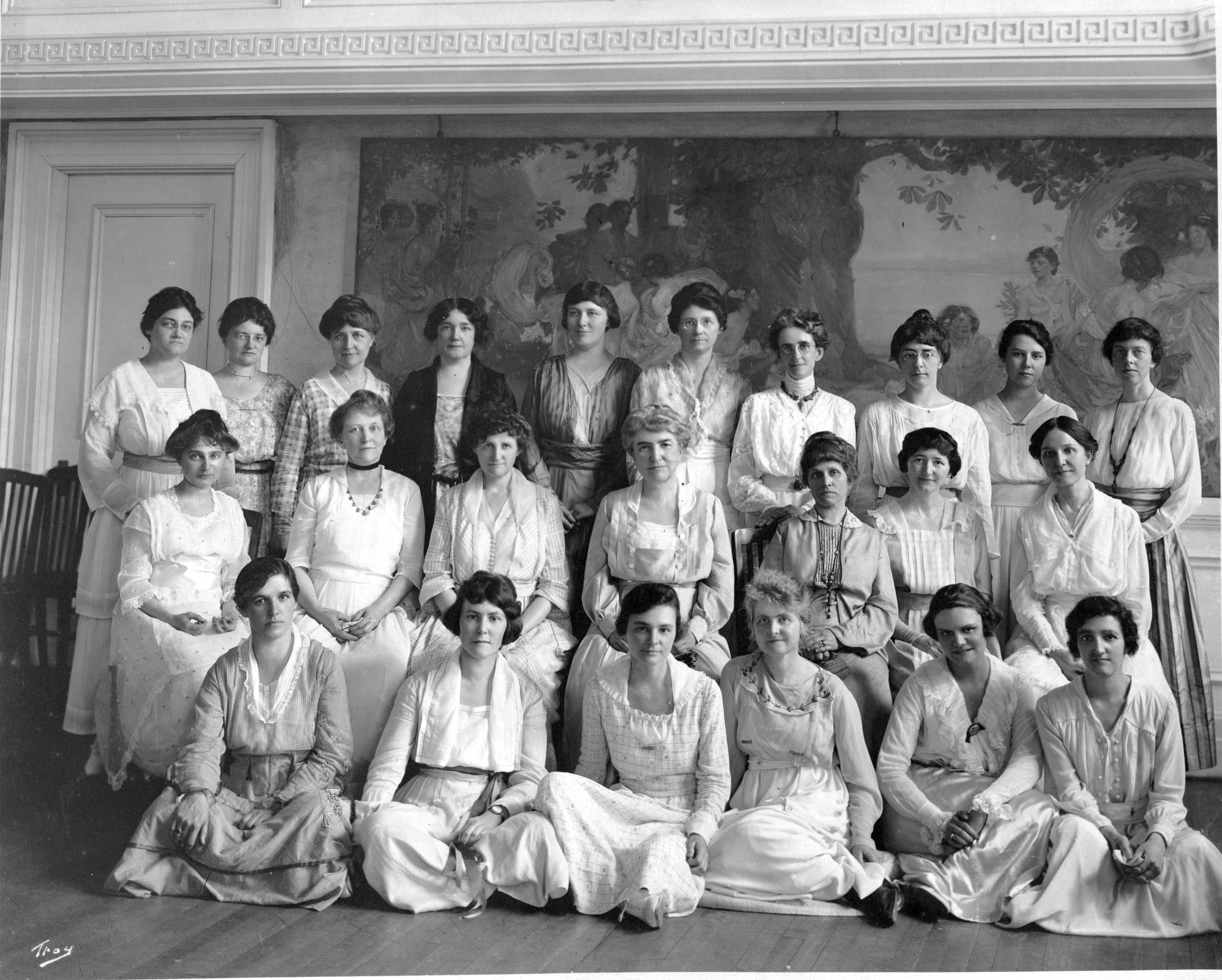
Faculty of the department of home economics at Cornell University about 1918–19; Helen Monsch is farthest right in the middle row. Other notable members of the faculty in this image include Claribel Nye, Flora Rose, Martha Van Rensselaer, Ruby Green Smith, Helen Binkerd Young, Alice Blinn, and Beulah Blackmore. (3856196872)

Monsch taught in nutrition programs at Simmons College, Iowa State College, and the public schools of Gary, Indiana. She did research on infant feedings at Iowa University Children's Hospital, Rush Medical College, the University of Illinois College of Medicine, and other programs.

Monsch began working at Cornell University in 1918, first teaching in the summer extension program. She was head of the food and nutrition department at Cornell from 1925 to 1947. She also directed health classes in the public schools of Ithaca, wrote newspaper articles on cooking, and gave public lectures on child nutrition.

Monsch wrote and narrated a short educational film about nutrition, For Health and Happiness (1941). After she retired from Cornell in 1947, she donated over 300 books to the university's home economics library.

== Publications ==
- Feeding Babies and Their Families (1943, with Marguerite Kaechele Harper)

== Personal life ==
Monsch retired to Winter Park, Florida, where at least two of her sisters also lived. She died there in 1959, at the age of 78.
