= Annette J. Warner =

American art educator

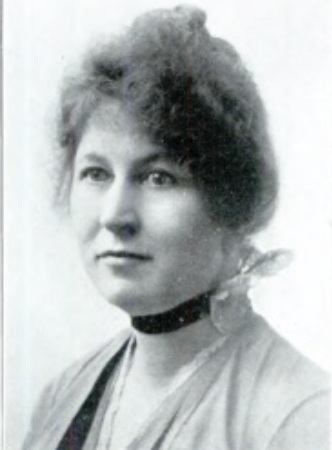
- Annette J. Warner, from the 1917 yearbook of Cornell University
- Born: Annette Jane Warner; June 18, 1860; Granby, Massachusetts, U.S.
- Died: November 10, 1949 (age 89); Santa Barbara, California, U.S.
- Occupations: Home economist, artist, educator

Annette Jane Warner (June 18, 1860 – November 10, 1949) was an American college professor, artist, and home economist. She taught in the home economics department at Cornell University from 1913 to 1929.

== Early life and education ==
Warner was born in Granby, Massachusetts, the daughter of Eli Warner and Samantha Cornelia Abbe Warner. She attended the Minnesota State Normal School at St. Cloud in 1883 and 1884, the Cowles Art School from 1885 to 1889, Massachusetts Normal Art School from 1889 to 1890, New York School of Fine and Applied Art from 1912 to 1913, and Columbia University in 1921. She also traveled in Europe studying art.

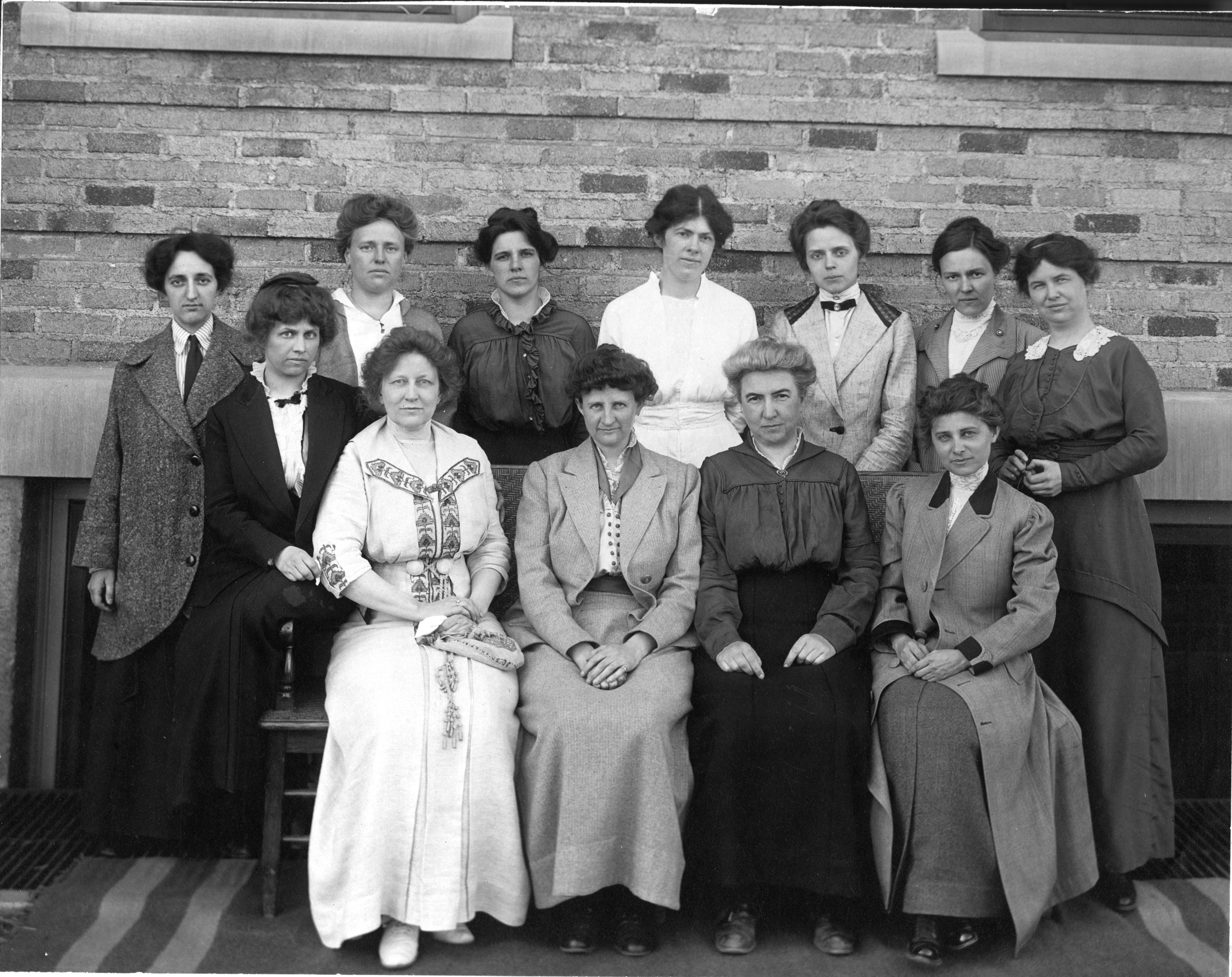
Faculty of the Cornell University home economics department in 1914. Seated, from left, are Helen Binkerd Young, Annette J. Warner, Flora Rose, Martha Van Rensselaer and Blanche Hazard (Mrs. Sprague). Standing, from left, are Claribel Nye, Helen Knowlton, Anna Hunn, Grace Fordyce (Mrs. Fox), Ethel L. Phelps, Clara Browning and Bertha Titsworth.

== Career ==
Warner was director of drawing and manual arts at the Minnesota State Normal School from 1890 to 1893. She supervised art education in the schools of Pittsfield, Massachusetts, from 1893 to 1897. From 1910 to 1911 she was principal of the John Herron Art School in Indianapolis. She was vice-principal of the Rogers Hall School in 1912 and 1913. She was a member of the home economics faculty at Cornell University from 1913 until her retirement in 1929; she gained full professor status in 1920.

In 1914 Warner gave a paper at the American Home Economics Association meeting, saying that "an ounce of taste is better than a pound of money" and "almost every problem connected with the home is an art problem." In 1925 she was one of the Cornell home economists who gave a radio lecture on WGY.

Warner was a member of the Eastern Art Teachers' Association, the College Art Association of America, the National Education Association, and the American Federation of Arts. She represented the United States at the International Art Congress held in Prague in 1928.

== Publications ==
- "Fall Nature Drawing" (1907)
- "Art in the Home" (1915)
- "The Decorative Use of Flowers" (1916)
- "Artistry in Dress" (1926)
- "Economics of Good Furnishings" (1927)

== Death ==
Warner lived with her brother Herbert in Massachusetts after retirement, and then in Santa Barbara, California, where she died in 1949, at the age of 89, after a stroke.
