= Helen Binkerd Young =

American architect

- Born: Helen Dorsey Binkerd; April 19, 1877; Dayton, Ohio, U.S.
- Died: May 22, 1959 (aged 82); Berkeley, California, U.S.
- Occupation: Architect
- Years active: 1900–1946
- Spouse: George Young Jr. (married November 29, 1902)

Helen Binkerd Young (1877–1959) was an early New York architect who graduated from Cornell University in 1900 and taught without being paid in the Cornell Home Economics Department from 1910 to 1921. Many of her lectures focused on architectural themes and organization. Her publications are still used in academic studies on housing design.

== Early life and education ==
Helen Dorsey Binkerd was born on April 19, 1877, in Dayton, Ohio, to Oscar William and Emma (née Brown) Binkerd. She attended the high school of Pratt Institute from 1892 to 1895 and went on to attain a Bachelors in Architecture from Cornell University in 1900, winning a medal for her drawing in that same year.

== Career ==
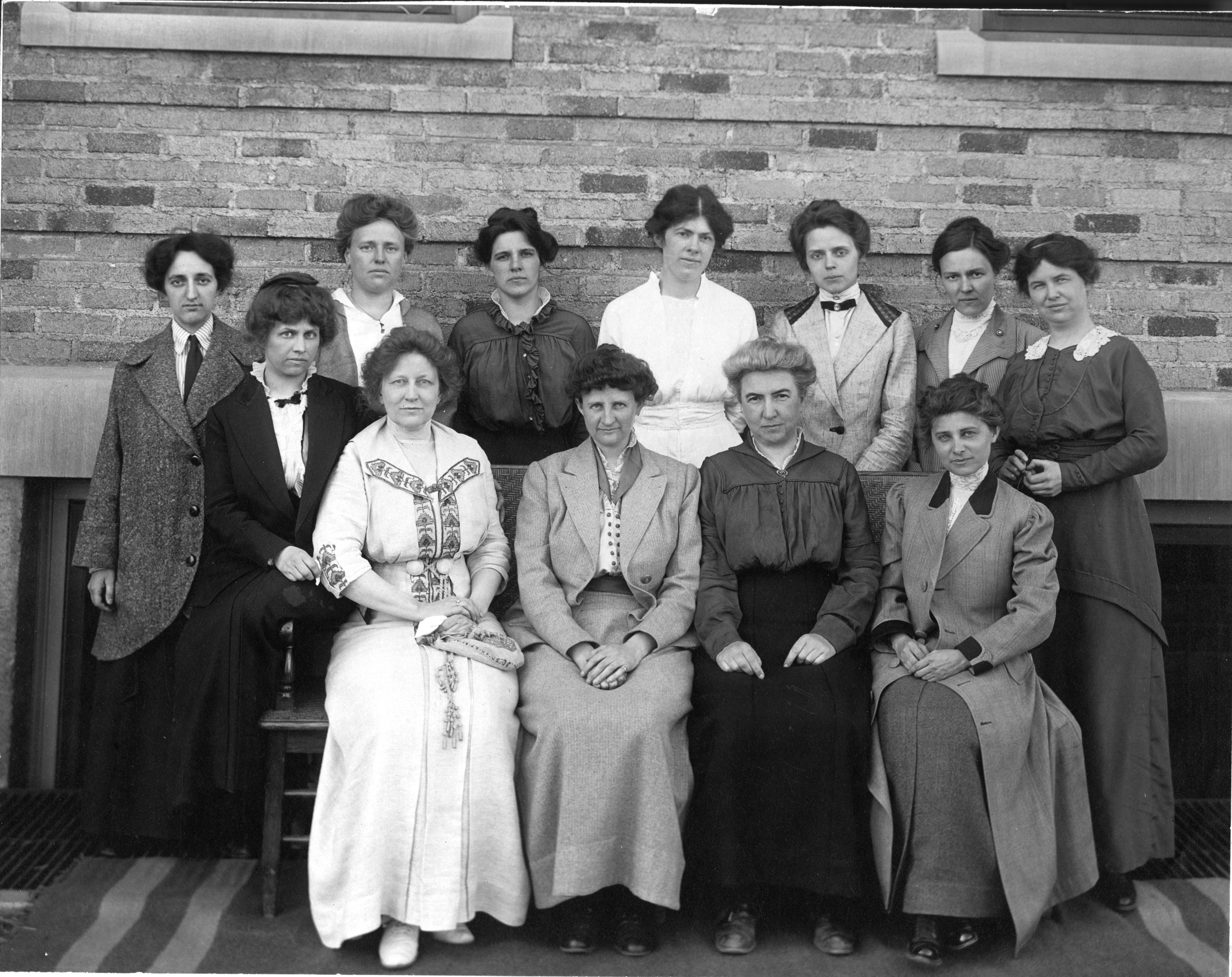
Faculty of the Cornell University home economics department in 1914. Seated, from left, are Helen Binkerd Young, Annette J. Warner, Flora Rose, Martha Van Rensselaer and Blanche Hazard (Mrs. Sprague). Standing, from left, are Claribel Nye, Helen Knowlton, Anna Hunn, Grace Fordyce (Mrs. Fox), Ethel L. Phelps, Clara Browning and Bertha Titsworth.

On November 29, 1902, she married George Young, Jr. in Brooklyn, New York City, (August 24, 1878 – January 15, 1956), a fellow architect. After their marriage, the couple lived for a brief time in New York City and Pittsburgh before returning to Ithaca, New York in the fall of 1909 when George was offered a position at Cornell University as Assistant Professor of Architecture. Unable to find work as an architect, or teaching architecture, Young took an unpaid position teaching in the Department of Home Economics at Cornell.

Young utilized her knowledge and training in architecture in her courses, stressing that of the three fundamental parts of domestic science, housing design was critical for properly organizing the work of a home. The second element, purposeful furnishings and fixtures, was also important for developing an environment conducive for both health and productivity. In addition to her college lectures, Young lectured at homemaker's conferences in various locations in the state. During this time, she also published several extension bulletins on similar themes, as well as participating in interviews for newspapers, such as the New York Times.

In 1918, she and George jointly designed "Hidden Home", their residence on Overlook Road, which was featured in the April 27, 1927, edition of The American Architect magazine. While few of her works have been identified, it is probable that her work was obscured by joint projects with her husband or other male colleagues. (Note: The Winter 2008 issue of Historic Ithaca's Preservation Quarterly stated that her work may have been co-projects with her husband and that her work "remained hidden". In a 2015 blog, written by the producers of the podcast show "Stuff Mom Never Told You" a listener identified her home as one that was built by the husband and wife team George and Helen Young, according to the signed plans) In 1920, Young was finally made a full professor, but she left the Department of Home Economics in 1921 to work as an architect and according to her obituary, she designed many of the homes in Cayuga Heights, New York. Her husband noted in 1926 that he had been contacted to design a home in New York and was uninterested, but that Young might be.

In 1946, George retired from Cornell and the couple moved to California Novato, California, where he died in 1956.

== Death ==
Young died on May 22, 1959, in Berkeley, California and was buried in Ellenville, New York.

== Legacy ==
Young's writings from her time at Cornell have been referenced in scholarly journals, like the Architectural Research Centers Consortium's Enquiry Magazine; the Winterthur Portfolio of the Henry Francis du Pont Winterthur Museum; and in a report evaluating "Closets in the Farm Home" prepared for Columbia University, among others.

== Published works ==
- Young, Helen Binkerd (October 1911). "Household decoration". The Cornell Reading Course for the Farm Home (5). Ithaca, New York: Cornell University.
- Young, Helen Binkerd (October 1911). "Household Furnishing". The Cornell Reading Course for the Farm Home (7). Ithaca, New York: Cornell University.
- Young, Helen Binkerd (October 1911). "The Farmhouse". The Cornell Reading Course for the Farm Home (39). Ithaca, New York: Cornell University.
- Young, Helen Binkerd (1912). "The Modern Home". The Cornell Reading Course for the Farm Home (43). Ithaca, New York: Cornell University.
- Young, Helen Binkerd (July 1916). "Planning the Home Kitchen". The Cornell Reading Course for the Farm Home (108). Ithaca, New York: Cornell University.
- Young, Helen Binkerd (1928). Path of a Free Soul: Offerings from a Private Journal, 1917-1927. s.i.: H.B. Young?.

== Sources ==
- Jennings, Jan (2005). Cheap and Tasteful Dwellings: Design Competitions and the Convenient Interior, 1879-1909. Knoxville, Tennessee: University of Tennessee Press. ISBN 978-1-57233-360-4.
- McMurry, Sally (1988). Families and Farmhouses in Nineteenth-Century America : Vernacular Design and Social Change: Vernacular Design and Social Change. New York, New York: Oxford University Press, USA. ISBN 978-0-19-536451-4.
- Office of Education (1914). "II. Cornell Reading Course for the Farm Home". Bulletin (United States. Bureau of Education) (32). Washington, D.C: Government Printing Office.
