= Miriam Birdseye =

American home economist (1878–1948)

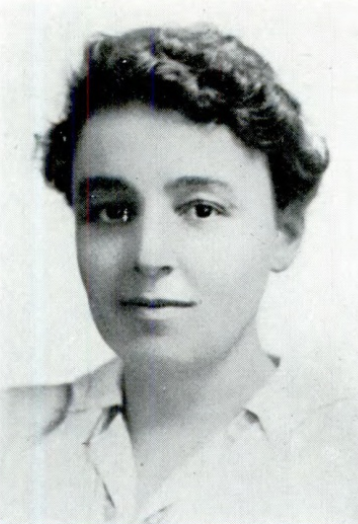
- Miriam Birdseye, from the 1917 yearbook of Cornell University
- Born: 1878; Brooklyn, New York, U.S.
- Died: August 28, 1948 (age 69); Carmel, California, U.S.
- Occupations: Home economist, nutritionist, college professor
- Relatives: Clarence Birdseye (brother)

Miriam Birdseye (1878 – August 28, 1948) was an American home economist, nutritionist, and college professor. She taught at Cornell University, Bates College and Simmons University, before a thirty-year career at the United States Department of Agriculture.

== Early life and education ==
Birdseye was born in Brooklyn, New York, the daughter of Clarence Frank Birdseye and Ada Jane Underwood Birdseye. Her brother was businessman and inventor Clarence Birdseye II. She attended Packer Collegiate Institute in Brooklyn, and graduated from Smith College in 1901. She trained to teach domestic science at Pratt Institute, and at Teachers College, Columbia University.

== Career ==
Birdseye worked at the National Lamp Association of Cleveland as a young woman, studying working conditions in the company's factories. She also taught school in New York City. From 1909 to 1910 she taught at Simmons College in Boston. She was head of the household economy department at Bates College from 1911 to 1912. She was a member of the home economics faculty at Cornell University beginning about 1915.

Birdseye was based in Washington, D.C., from 1917 to 1946, as a nutrition specialist in the Department of Agriculture's extension service. She traveled throughout the United States as a speaker at state extension program conferences. She also spoke to women's clubs, and contributed to a 1941 educational film, For Health and Happiness, directed by Helen Monsch.

Birdseye was a member of the National Society for the Promotion of Industrial Education, and chaired the Textile Standardization Committee of the American Home Economics Association. She was a member of the Smith College Alumnae Association, the Zonta Club, and the Women's City Club in Washington.

== Publications and reports ==
Birdseye's work at the United States Department of Agriculture often involved writing reports, many of which are now available online.

- Extension Work in Foods and Nutrition (1923)
- Adequate Diets for Families with Limited Incomes (1931, with Hazel K. Stiebeling)
- "How to make the foods and nutrition project contribute to the general growth of home demonstration club members" (1936)
- "Some nutrition facts every 4-H club member should learn" (1936)
- "Food budget adjustments in drought areas" (1936)
- "Help for herb-garden demonstrators" (1936)
- "Notes on using herbs in landscaping" (1937)
- "Introduction", in Leonie de Sounin's Magic in Herbs (1941)
- "How the school lunch program in Barbour County, West Virginia, was organized and carried on in 1939-40" (1944)
- "Selected Herb Recipes" (1946)
- Savory Herbs: Culture and Use (1946, with M. S. Lowman)

== Personal life ==
Birdseye lived in Washington with a Bohemian baroness, Leonie de Sounin, for more than a decade. De Sounin died in 1942. Birdseye retired to Carmel, California, and died there in 1948, at the age of 69.

A character named "Miriam Birdseye" is featured in Nancy Spain's detective novels, but the character has little in common with the American nutritionist.
