= College of Human Ecology =

College of Human Ecology is the name of several colleges at various universities dealing with the study of human ecology:

== Asia ==
- College of Human Ecology at Chungnam National University
- College of Human Ecology at Dong-A University
- College of Human Ecology at Inha University
- College of Human Ecology at Seoul National University
- College of Human Ecology at Shih-Chien University
- College of Human Ecology at University of the Philippines, Los Baños
- College of Human Ecology at Yonsei University

== United States ==
- Cornell University College of Human Ecology at Cornell University
- The College of Human Ecology at East Carolina University at East Carolina University
- College of Human Ecology at Kansas State University
- College of Human Ecology at Michigan State University
- College of Human Ecology at the University of Minnesota
- College of Human Ecology at the Ohio State University

== See also ==
- School of Human Ecology at the University of Wisconsin
