= Beulah Blackmore =

American home economist

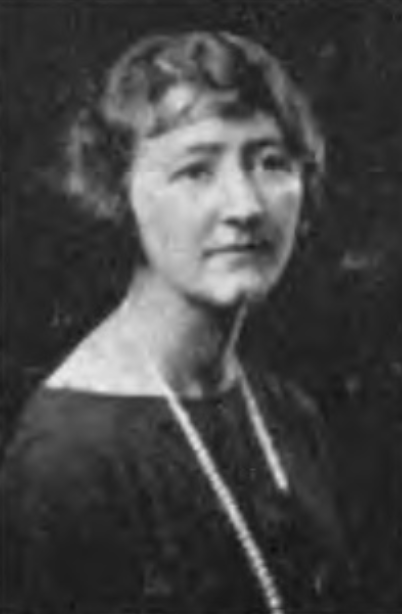
- Blackmore in the 1927 Cornell University yearbook
- Born: April 6, 1886; Vassar, Michigan, U.S.
- Died: July 29, 1967 (aged 81); Ithaca, New York, U.S.
- Occupations: Home economist, college professor

Beulah Blackmore (April 6, 1886 – July 29, 1967) was an American home economist on the faculty of Cornell University from 1915 to 1951, and head of the New York State College of Human Ecology at Cornell University's Textiles and Clothing department from 1925 to 1951.

== Early life and education ==
Blackmore was born in Vassar, Michigan, the daughter of Oliver Blackmore and Anna Blackmore. Her brother, John James Blackmore, was a professional musician. She attended high school in Tuscola County, and graduated from Teachers College, Columbia University in 1917. Later she completed graduate work at the Massachusetts Institute of Technology. Prior to her appointment at Cornell, Blackmore was a public school teacher in Howard City, Michigan, and Tacoma, Washington.

== Career ==
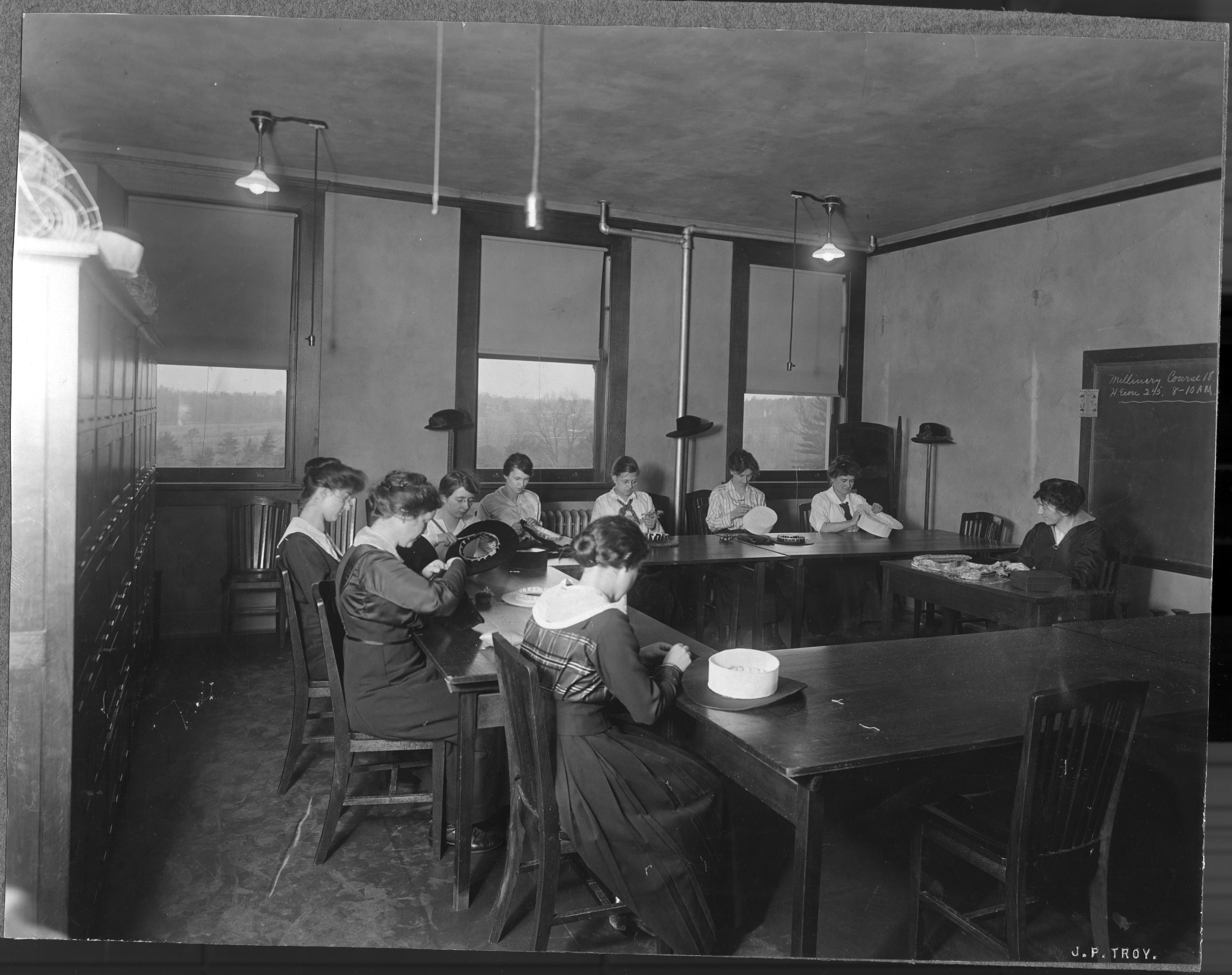
Millinery laboratory in home economics building (now Comstock Hall), with Beulah Blackmore presiding. No – (3855512565)

Blackmore taught in the home economics department at Cornell University beginning in 1915, including such courses as "Elements of Design", "Clothing and Handwork", and "Elementary Millinery". She became a full professor in 1923, and served as head of the textiles and clothing program from 1925 until her retirement in 1951. She oversaw the creation of the school's costume shop, home economics courses for male students, a collection of historical textiles and international garments, and a diverse research program on clothing and fabric. She also introduced courses and research on how psychology influences clothing. The Department of Textiles and clothing expanded under her leadership to 19 staff members and more than 20 courses.

In 1915, Blackmore created the Cornell Fashion and Textile Collection to use as a teaching tool in clothing and textiles courses with a focus on non-Western clothing. She took a sabbatical from teaching in 1936, traveling in search of more pieces for the collection. Her travels began in South America before she ventured to Asia, the Middle East and North Africa, and Europe, returning to Cornell with more than 20 complete outfits from varying cultures as well as numerous other textiles. She also donated her own collection of rare objects and books on these subjects to the college.

In addition to her work within the Cornell University campus, Blackmore taught community classes on creating new clothes for children out of discarded textiles and gave interviews and lectures on consumer advice.

== Publications ==
Blackmore wrote textbook chapters and technical reports; she also wrote articles on home economics topics for The Delineator magazine in the 1920s.

- "The Making of Clothing" and "Millinery" (1919, textbook chapters)
- "Watch Your Step in the Dining-Room" (1922, with Flora Rose)
- "A Clothing Project" (1922)
- "How Will You Pack When You Go Away?" (1924)
- "Know Your Mattress" and "Know Your Boxspring" (1924)
- "Make Clothes Closets Convenient" (1925)
- "Selecting Your Bedcovers" (1925)
- "The Clothes We Wear" (1928)
- "Clothing purchased by farm families in Tompkins County, New York, 1927–28" (1934)

== Personal life ==
Blackmore lived with fellow home economist Helen Canon in Ithaca, New York for more than thirty years. Blackmore and Canon were recognized by their friends as partners with an "eternal" relationship. Canon died in 1954. Blackmore died at home in 1967, at the age of 81.
