= Muddy Bay (Newfoundland and Labrador) =

Bay in Newfoundland and Labrador

Coordinates: 53.652°N 57.055°W

Location of Muddy Bay in Newfoundland and Labrador

Muddy Bay is a bay on the coast of Labrador in the province of Newfoundland and Labrador, Canada. It is a small eastern inlet of Favorite Tickle, a strait connecting Sandwich Bay in the south with the Atlantic Ocean in the north. The bay has a maximum depth between 18 and 20 meters.

In the early 19th century, a salmon post was operational in Muddy Bay. On the northern shore, there is a former settlement that is also called Muddy Bay.
