= Muddy Bay =

Coordinates: 53.652°N 57.055°W

Location of Muddy Bay in Newfoundland and Labrador

Muddy Bay is a former settlement on the coast of Labrador in the province of Newfoundland and Labrador, Canada. It was located on the shore of Muddy Bay, a small bay of Favorite Tickle. Muddy Bay was deeply impacted by the 1918 Influenza Pandemic which resulted in the deaths of 21% of its total population of 320 at the time. The Labrador Public School opened by the Anglican Church in 1920 as part of the Canadian Indian residential school system was primarily occupied by orphaned children due to the casualties.

In 1913 Clarence Birdseye purchased land at Muddy Bay where he built a ranch to keep foxes.
