= Clarence Birdseye =

American inventor, entrepreneur, and naturalist

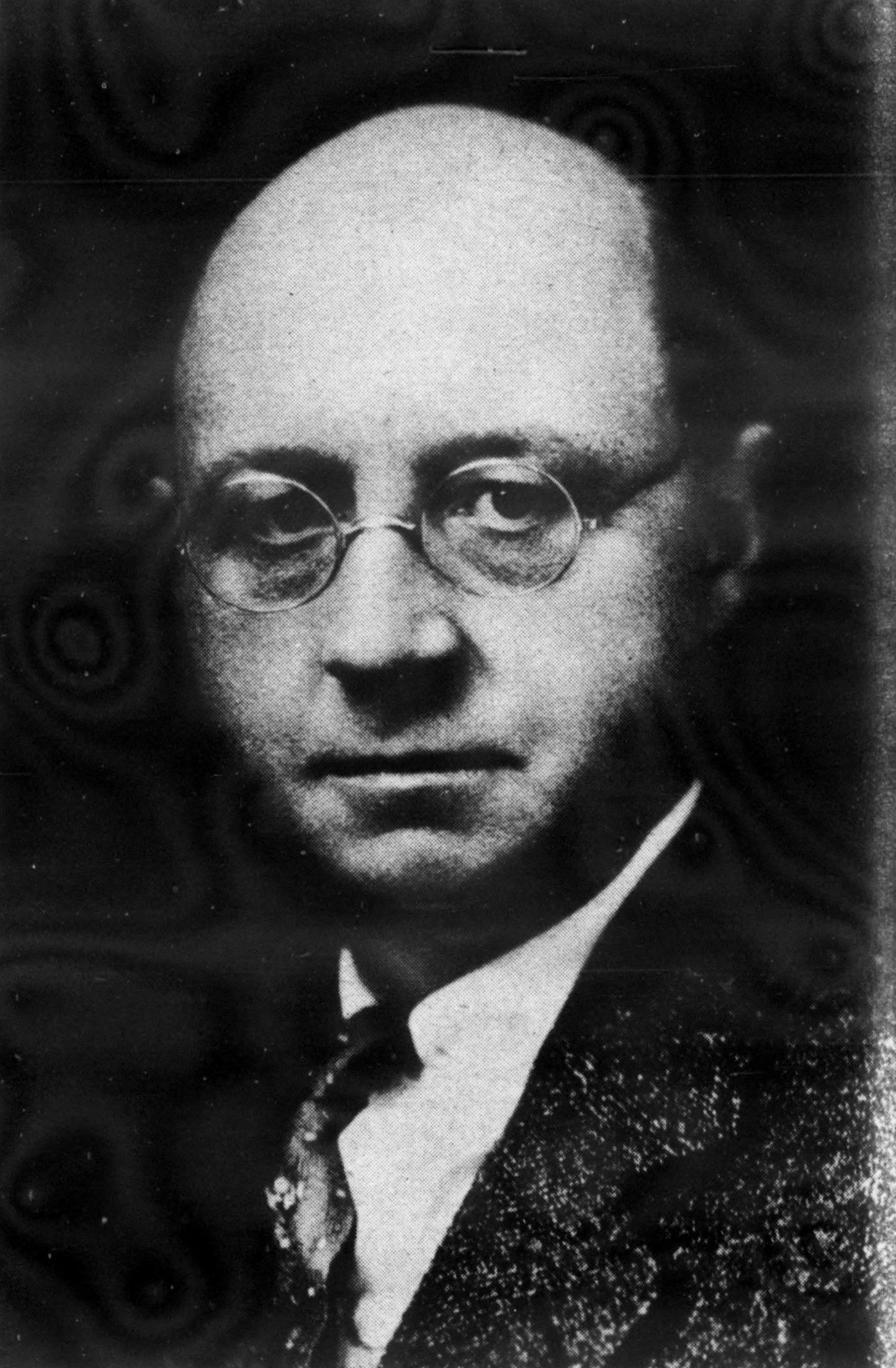
- Birdseye c. 1930
- Born: Clarence Birdseye; December 9, 1886; New York, US
- Died: October 7, 1956 (aged 69); New York City, US
- Occupations: Inventor; entrepreneur; naturalist
- Known for: Establishing the modern frozen food industry
- Relatives: Miriam Birdseye (sister)

Clarence Birdseye (December 9, 1886 – October 7, 1956) was an American inventor, entrepreneur, and naturalist, who is widely considered the founder of the modern frozen food industry. He developed methods for quick-freezing food products that led to the commercial success of frozen foods in the United States. He founded several companies that later became associated with the '''Birds Eye''' brand.

Born in New York City, Birdseye developed an early interest in natural science and taxidermy. After studying at Amherst College, he worked for the United States Department of Agriculture as a field naturalist and conducted wildlife surveys in the American West and Labrador. While in Labrador between 1912 and 1915, he observed Inuit methods of rapidly freezing freshly caught fish in Arctic conditions, leading him to study how rapid freezing preserved food texture and flavor better than conventional slow freezing.

In the 1920s, Birdseye began experimenting with commercial food preservation and developed several freezing technologies, including the double belt freezer and multiplate freezing machine. In 1924 he founded General Seafood Corporation, which marketed frozen fish products using his quick-freezing methods. In 1929, the company and its patents were acquired by Goldman Sachs and the Postum Cereal Company, later General Foods, for $22 million.

In 1949, Birdseye won the Institute of Food Technologists' Babcock-Hart Award. and in 2005 Birdseye was inducted into the National Inventors Hall of Fame.

== Early life and education ==
Clarence Birdseye was the sixth of nine children of Clarence Frank Birdseye, a lawyer in an insurance firm, and Ada Jane Underwood. His first years were spent in New York, New York, where his family owned a townhouse in Cobble Hill, Brooklyn. From childhood, Birdseye was obsessed with natural science and with taxidermy, which he taught himself by correspondence. At the age of eleven he advertised his courses in the subject. When he was fourteen, the family moved to the suburb of Montclair, New Jersey, where Birdseye graduated from Montclair High School. He matriculated at Amherst College, where his father and elder brother had earned degrees. There he excelled at science, although an average student in other subjects. His obsession with collecting insects led his college classmates to nickname him "Bugs".

In the summer after his freshman year, Birdseye worked for the United States Department of Agriculture (USDA) in New Mexico and Arizona as an “assistant naturalist”, at a time when the agency was concerned with helping farmers and ranchers get rid of predators, chiefly coyotes.

In 1908, family finances forced Birdseye to withdraw from college after his second year. In 1917, Birdseye's father and elder brother Kellogg went to prison for defrauding their employer; whether this was related to Birdseye's withdrawal from Amherst is unclear.

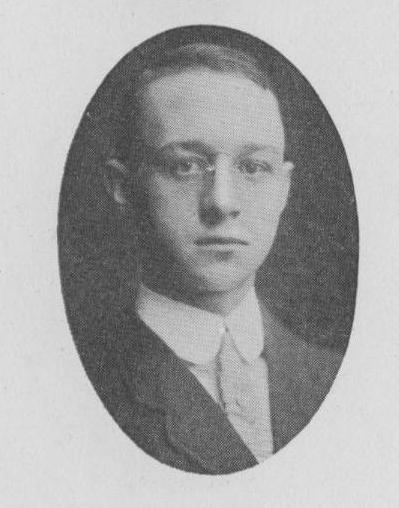
1910 yearbook photo of Birdseye

Birdseye was once again hired by the USDA, this time for a project surveying animals in the American West. He also worked with entomologist Willard Van Orsdel King (1888–1970) in Montana, where, in 1910 and 1911, he captured several hundred small mammals from which King removed several thousand ticks for research, isolating them as the cause of Rocky Mountain spotted fever, a breakthrough. Birdseye's next field assignment, intermittently from 1912 to 1915, was in Labrador in the Dominion of Newfoundland (now part of Canada), where he became further interested in food preservation by freezing, especially fast freezing. He purchased land at Muddy Bay, where he built a ranch for raising foxes. He was taught by the Inuit how to ice fish under very thick ice. In −40 °C (−40 °F) weather, the Inuit also demonstrated that freshly caught fish could be then instantly flash frozen when exposed to air, and when thawed, still tasted fresh. He recognized the potential that this traditional knowledge held if it were to be employed in production since the frozen seafood sold in New York was of lower quality than the frozen fish of Labrador. This 1920s hunting trip to Canada, where he witnessed the traditional methods of the indigenous Inuit, directly inspired Birdseye's food preserving method.

When food is frozen slowly, at temperatures near the freezing point, ice crystals form within the animal or vegetable cells; when the food thaws, cellular fluid leaks from the damaged tissue, giving the food a mushy or dry consistency. Rapid freezing, at lower temperatures, gives crystals less time to form and thus does less damage.

In 1922, Birdseye conducted fish-freezing experiments at the Clothel Refrigerating Company, and then established his own company, Birdseye Seafoods Inc., to freeze fish fillets with chilled air at −43 °C (−45 °F). In 1924, his company went bankrupt for lack of consumer interest in the product. That same year, he developed an entirely new process for commercially viable quick-freezing: packing fish in cartons, then freezing the contents between two refrigerated surfaces under pressure. Birdseye created General Seafood Corporation to promote this method.

== Industrial development ==
In 1925, General Seafood Corporation moved to Gloucester, Massachusetts. There it marketed and sold Birdseye's newest invention, the double belt freezer, in which cold brine chilled a pair of stainless steel belts carrying packaged fish, freezing the fish quickly. His invention was issued US Patent #1,773,079, considered by some as the advent of flash freezing and the commercial frozen fresh foods market. Birdseye patented other machinery which cooled even more quickly. In 1927, he patented the multiplate freezing machine which was used as the basis for freezing food for several decades.

In 1929, Birdseye sold his company and patents to Goldman Sachs and the Postum Company which eventually became General Foods Corporation, when its owner, Marjorie Merriweather Post, offered him $22 million (approximately $335 million in 2021 dollars) and the vice president position after touring the facilities. She came across the Birdseye's innovation by dining onboard her yacht on a scrumptious whole fresh turkey that was purchased frozen. General Foods founded the Birds Eye Frozen Food Company as Post pioneered the frozen fresh food market by providing commercial freezers to wholesalers and retailers. Birdseye grew the company and further developed his frozen food technology. In 1930, the company began sales experiments in 18 retail stores around Springfield, Massachusetts, to test consumer acceptance of quick-frozen foods. The initial product line featured 26 items, including 18 cuts of frozen meat, spinach and peas, a variety of fruits and berries, blue point oysters, and fish fillets. Consumers liked the new products, and today this is considered the birth of retail frozen foods. The "Birds Eye" name remains a leading frozen-food brand. In 1949, Birdseye won the Institute of Food Technologists' Babcock-Hart Award. Birdseye was inducted into the National Inventors Hall of Fame in 2005.

== Death ==
Birdseye died on October 7, 1956, of a heart attack at the Gramercy Park Hotel at the age of 69. He was cremated and his ashes were scattered in the sea off the coast of Gloucester, Massachusetts.

== Legacy ==
In 2012 a book-length biography of Birdseye, Mark Kurlansky's Birdseye: The Adventures of a Curious Man, was published by Doubleday.

== Birdseye inventions related to food products ==
- Method of preserving piscatorial products, 1924.
- Brining machine, 1925.
- Method in preparing foods and the product obtained thereby, 1926.
- Refrigerating apparatus; 1930, 1931, 1932, 1933, 1935.
- Method of packaging fruit juices, 1930.
- Bin for storage of fish, 1931.
- Refrigerating apparatus and method of refrigerating food products, 1931.
- Fish scaling device, 1933.
- Consumer package of meat products, 1933.
- Food product and method of preparing the same, 1934.
- Freezing and packaging food products, 1934.
- Method and apparatus for freezing food products, 1935.
