= Dora Erway =

American home economist

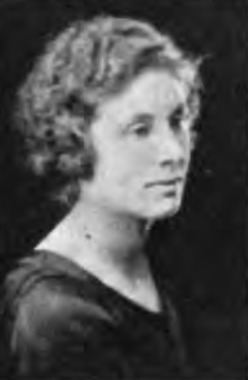
- Dora Wetherbee (later Erway), from the 1926 yearbook of Cornell University
- Born: Dora Ella Wetherbee; November 19, 1889; Fitchburg, Massachusetts
- Died: December 5, 1976 (aged 87); Ithaca, New York
- Occupations: Home economist, college professor, artist
- Spouse: Edgar W. Erway

Dora Wetherbee Erway (November 19, 1889 – December 5, 1976) was an artist and home economist on the faculty of Cornell University from 1921 to 1958. She is best remembered today for the Dora Erway Doll Collection, a set of 37 dolls in elaborate historical costumes, made by her students in the 1920s.

== Early life and education ==
Dora Ella Wetherbee was born and raised in Fitchburg, Massachusetts, the daughter of Vernon Wetherbee and Iola E. Wetherbee (later Nutting). Her father was a contractor. Her parents divorced in 1894.

She graduated from Massachusetts Normal Art School in 1912, and attended summer programs at the Commonwealth Art Colony in Boothbay Harbor, Maine for several years. She traveled widely and made further studies as possible, ranging freely across disciplines and institutions. Her art teachers included Cyrus Edwin Dallin and Albert Henry Munsell.

== Career ==
Erway taught art at the high school and college level as a young woman. She was a professor of color and design in the College of Home Economics at Cornell from 1921 to 1958. She was acting head of the Household Art Department in 1944 and 1945. She served on the advisory board of the Journal of Home Economics, and chaired a national committee of the American Home Economics Association. She lectured on textile history and other subjects to community groups.

She spent much of a sabbatical year in 1955 in South America, studying "Inca civilization and culture." She also made wood carvings, and painted in watercolors and oils, and exhibited her paintings and carvings in several gallery shows, including a one-woman show in New York City.

== Personal life ==
Dora Wetherbee married insurance agent Edgar William Erway in the mid-1920s. Her husband was born in 1906, 16 years her junior. She died in 1976, at the age of 87, in Ithaca, New York. The Dora Erway Doll Collection at Cornell includes 37 dolls made in the 1920s by students in Erway's sewing classes, dressed in historical costumes using fabric scraps and, sometimes, their own hair.
