= Claribel Nye =

American home economist

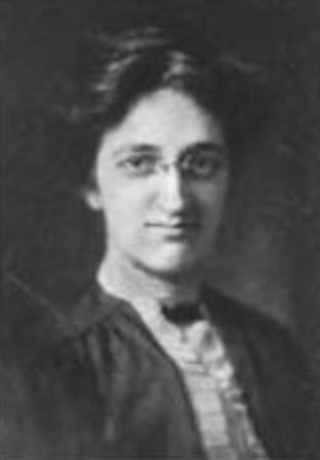
- Claribel Nye, from the 1914 yearbook of Cornell University
- Born: July 18, 1889; Auburn, New York
- Died: November 22, 1960 (age 71); Berkeley, California
- Occupations: Home economist, educator

Claribel Nye (July 18, 1889 – November 22, 1960) was an American home economist. She was based at Cornell University early in her career, and then in Oregon and California. She was elected vice-president of the American Home Economics Association in 1946.

== Early life and education ==
Nye was born in Auburn, New York, the daughter of Jay Powers Nye and Ruth Anna Hammond Nye. She graduated from Cornell University in 1914. She earned a master's degree from Teachers College, Columbia University in 1927.

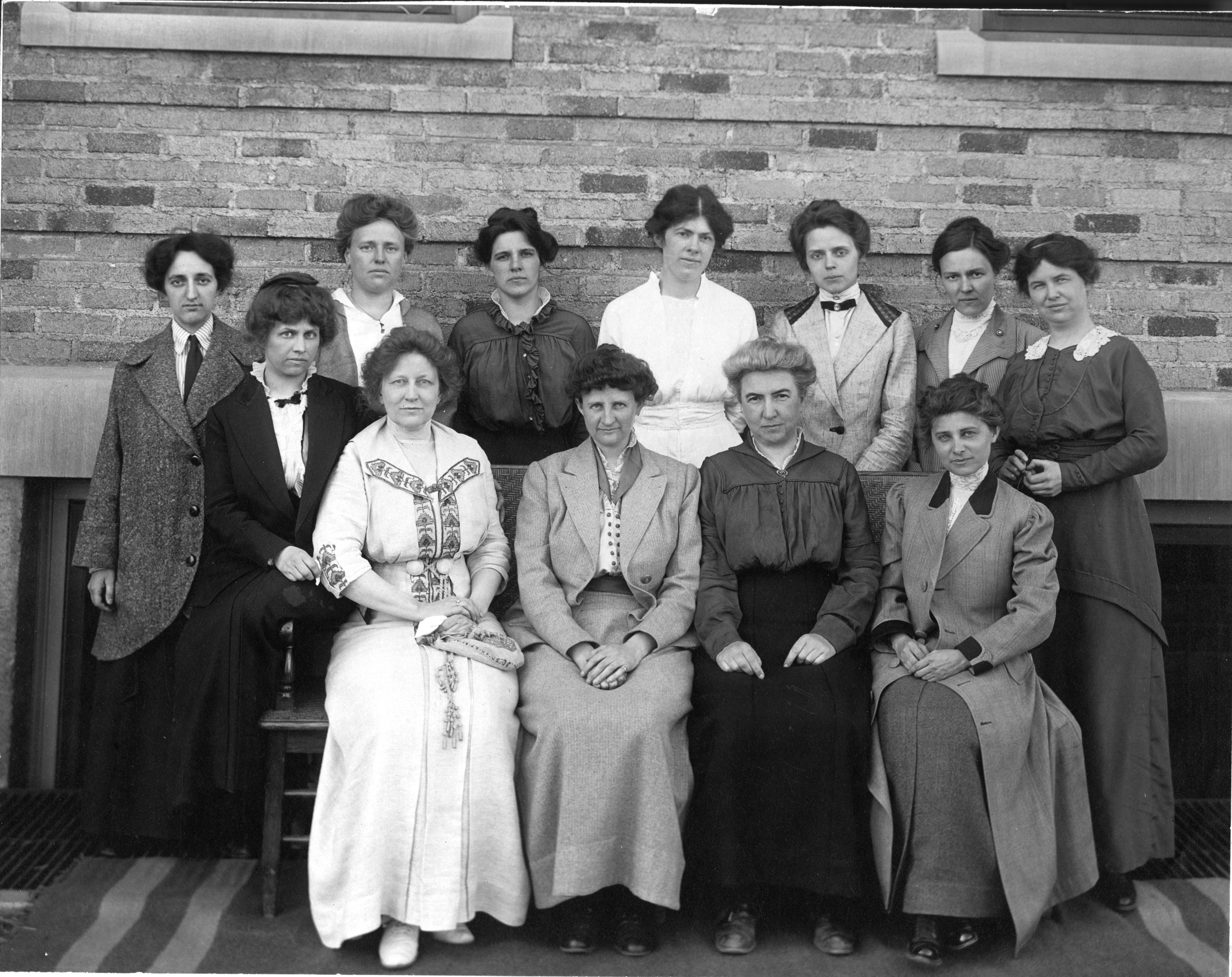
Faculty of the department of home economics in 1914. Seated, from left, are Helen Binkerd Young, Annette J. Warner, Flora Rose, Martha Van Rensselaer and Blanche Evans Hazard (Mrs. Sprague). Standing, from left, are Claribel Nye, Helen Knowlton, Anna Hunn, Grace Fordyce (Mrs. Fox), Ethel L. Phelps, Clara Browning and Bertha Titsworth.

== Career ==
Nye joined the faculty of the Cornell home economics extension program immediately after graduation. As a state leader of the extension service, she traveled across New York State, giving classes and lectures, training local demonstrators, and studying local issues, especially those affecting farmwomen.

During World War I, Nye worked on food conservation programs, assisting her Cornell colleague Martha Van Rensselaer in Washington, D.C. at the United States Food Administration. After the war, back in Ithaca, she became leader of the Cornell Study Clubs, a statewide adult education program aimed at women. Some of her study results were announced with blunt headlines like "Best Husbands are City Bred" or "Women Like to Take Care of Children."

In 1930, Nye moved to Oregon, and later to California, doing similar work in supervising agricultural extension programs. In 1946, she was elected vice president of the American Home Economics Association.

== Publications ==
- "A canning business for the farm home" (1913, with Bessie Earll Austin)
- "Home Economics and the Rural School" (1915)
- "The Canning of Fruits and Vegetables" (1915)
- "A Greeting to Freshmen in Home Economics" (1915)
- "Secrets of Making Good Bread" (1924)
- "How Good is Your Bread?" (1924)

== Personal life ==
From 1940 to 1959, Nye lived in the Berkeley Hills, and shared a home with her former mentor and colleague, Flora Rose. Nye and Rose drove together from California to New York and back, and visited Cornell again, in 1954. Rose died in 1959, and Nye died in 1960, at the age of 71, in Berkeley.
