= Susan Margaret Watkins =

American professor (born 1943)

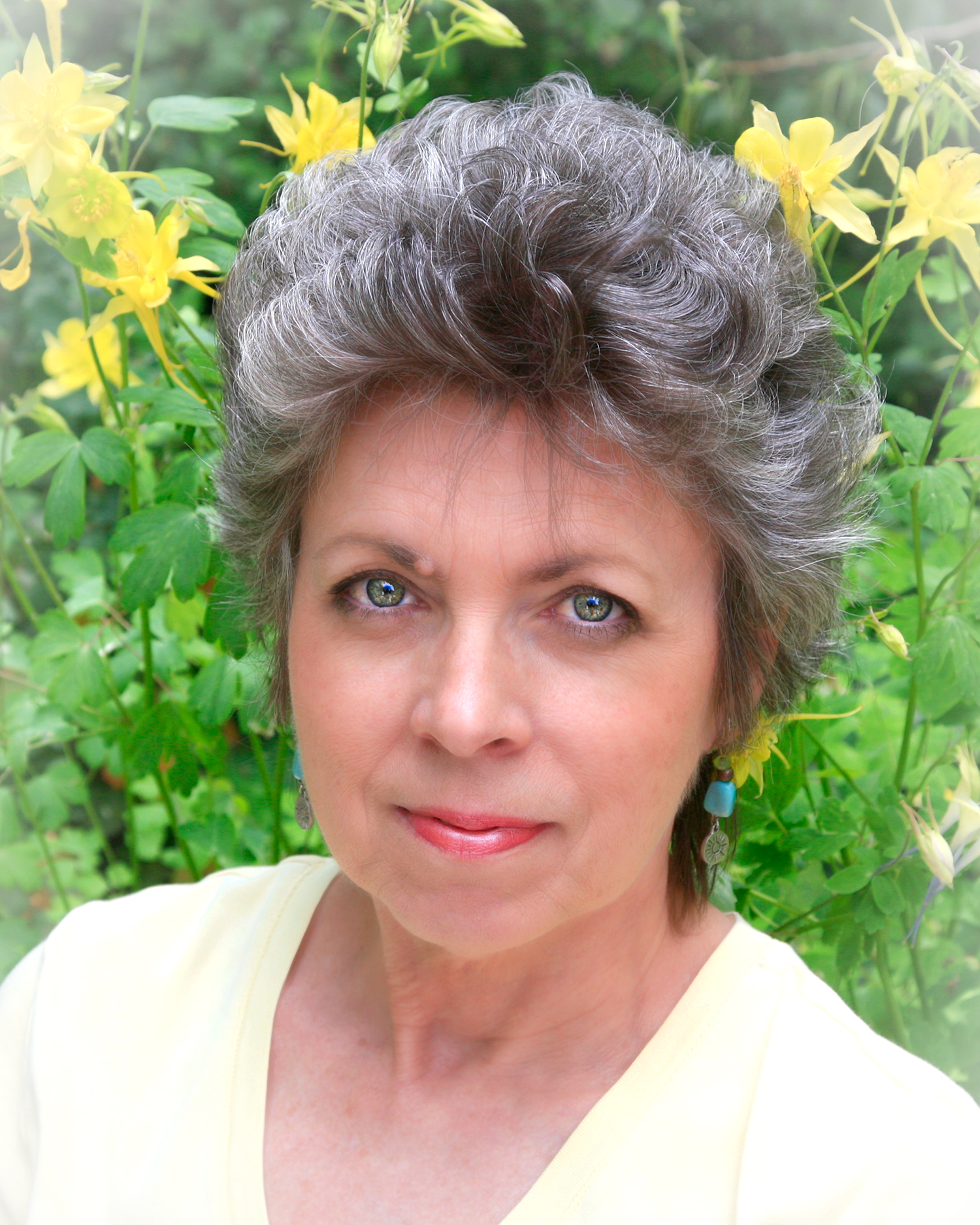
- Born: June 12, 1943 (age 83); Jacksonville, Florida
- Education: Pennsylvania State University
- Awards: 2014, Honorary Sc.D., University of Minnesota; 2000, The Mack and Effie Campbell Tyner Eminent Scholar Chair, Florida State University; 1991, Fellow, International Textile and Apparel Association
- Scientific career
- Fields: Technical Apparel, Functional Design
- Workplaces: Cornell University.

Susan Margaret Watkins (born June 12, 1943) is a Cornell University professor emerita who founded the academic field of functional apparel design. She is the author of the seminal textbook in the field, Clothing: The Portable Environment (1984), and holds patents as a result of her collaborative research with the U.S. Army, the U.S. Air Force, firefighters associations, and other industrial partners. In 1991 Watkins was inducted as a Fellow into the International Textile and Apparel Association (ITAA), the highest honor awarded by the organization, for her contributions in shaping the field of functional apparel design.

== Biography ==
Watkins was born on June 12, 1943, in Jacksonville, Florida. Her grandmother taught her how to sew on a treadle sewing machine. After graduating from Central Dauphin High School, in Harrisburg, Pennsylvania, she pursued clothing design as her profession with the goal of teaching at the university level.

She received her B.S. in 1965 and her M.S. in 1967 from Pennsylvania State University in Textiles and Clothing, with a focus on the social and psychological aspects of clothing. In 2014, she was awarded an honorary Doctor of Science degree by the University of Minnesota in recognition for establishing the field of functional apparel design and for her continuing contributions to the field.

== Academic career ==
Watkins was a faculty member and researcher at Cornell University from 1967 to 1998, attaining the rank of Professor in the Cornell University College of Human Ecology in 1987, and is currently an Emeritus Professor in the Department of Fiber Science & Apparel Design. She spent time in residence as a visiting professor at Oregon State University, the University of Minnesota, Kansas State University, and Seattle Pacific University.

== Development of the Functional Design Program ==
Watkins’s work at Cornell focused on training apparel designers to understand and create garments designed primarily to function well for workers needing protection, for athletes, and for the military.

Watkins organized collaborations with apparel companies for her students and discussed the theory and process of apparel design with academic colleagues and industry partners. These projects played a significant role in shifting the focus in the curriculum at the Department of Textiles and Clothing from preparing young women for work in the home, managing a family, toward preparing them to work in the apparel industry.

In the late 1960s Watkins came in contact with Dr. Stephen J. Kennedy, then director of what is now the United States Army Soldier Systems Center. He gave a presentation at Cornell University in which he described the challenges involved in developing uniforms and protective clothing for soldiers. He could not find people with expertise in the area of apparel design to hire so instead hired engineers and trained them in clothing design after they had joined the army research lab. He said that it took him 12 or 13 years to retrain engineers to be effective designers of clothing that functioned well for soldiers.

Because no university had a program yet that focused on functional apparel design, Watkins worked with the army to identify the skills and knowledge required for a designer to fill this need; she then led the development of a program at Cornell University that would instruct apparel students in functional design by incorporating principles of science and engineering into a curriculum grounded in a thorough understanding of the design process.

Throughout the 1970s and 80s, Watkins spoke extensively about the critical need for research and education in functional apparel design to other universities and industry associations, including an influential presentation at a 1989 conference of the Association of College Professors of Textiles and Clothing (ACPTC) (now the International Textile and Apparel Association (ITAA). The ITAA has since actively supported research, teaching, design, and design exhibition of functional apparel.

== Clothing: The Portable Environment ==
In 1984, Watkins published Clothing: The Portable Environment, which has become the foremost textbook for functional apparel design courses and programs and serves as a valued resource for professional designers. Her multidisciplinary, theory-based approach to creating or improving designs is used in apparel programs across the United States and abroad. A second edition was published in 1995. Both editions have been translated into Japanese and Korean.

In describing Watkins’s contribution to the textile and apparel design fields through her curriculum development and textbook, author and North Carolina State University professor Kate Carroll notes that "a thorough background in mechanics, body structures, the properties of materials, basic psychology, and assessment of visual appeal” is necessary for the design of functional apparel, in contrast to that of “ready-to-wear goods, where most consumers buy a product for its looks rather than for a special function."

Braddock and O'Mahony also acknowledge Susan Watkins contribution in the 1996 edition of Techno Textiles stating that her characterization of clothing as our most intimate environment is an important part of survival today, as functional garments have developed to the point where they maintain an active rather than a passive relationship with the body, a relationship that was predicted in the first edition of Clothing: The Portable Environment.

In January 2015, Watkins and co-author Lucy Dunne published a new book, Functional Clothing Design: From Sportswear to Spacesuits

== Pedagogical influence ==
Watkins’s development of teaching methodologies, courses, and projects for graduate and undergraduate students on the topic of functional apparel design took place in conjunction with her research and consulting projects with the U.S. Army, the U.S. Air Force, firefighters associations, and many industrial partners. She arranged collaborations between students and industry personnel to advance students’ education and hands-on experience while benefiting industry and wearers of protective clothing. These projects are further detailed in her 1988 publication "Using the Design Process to Teach Functional Apparel Design".

== Retirement activities ==
Following her retirement from Cornell in 1998, Watkins continues to work as a consultant and designer, conducting workshops for both industry and academia, reviewing submissions for peer-reviewed journals, and participating in invited lectures at engineering schools and conferences in the emerging field of wearable technology. She is currently designer and manager of Portable Environments, LLC, a consulting firm for functional design.

== Selected works ==
- Watkins, S. M. (1977). The design of protective equipment for ice hockey. Home Economics Research Journal 5 (3), 154–166.
- Watkins, S. M. (1977). Apparel design for physical activity. Journal of Physical Education and Recreation 48 (2), 40–41.
- Watkins, S. M. Designing clothing for coal miners. Journal of Home Economics 69 (1), 24–27.
- Costantakos, A. V., & Watkins, S. M. (1982). Pressure analysis as a design research technique for increasing the comfort of nursing brassieres. Home Economics Research Journal 10 (3), 271–278.
- Watkins, S. M., & Langan, L. (1987). Pressure of menswear on the neck in relation to visual performance. Human Factors 29 (1), 67–71.
- Watkins, S. M. (1988). Using the design process to teach functional apparel design. Clothing and Textiles Research Journal 7 (1), 10–14.
- Gerner, J. L., & Watkins, S. M. (1989). Responsibility for product safety: Legal and ethical issues. Human Ecology Forum 17 (3), 2–7.
- Watkins, S. M. (1989). Padding against injury. College Athletic Management 1 (1), 25–27.
- Ashdown, S. P., & Watkins, S. M. (1992). Movement analysis as the basis for the development and evaluation of a protective coverall design for asbestos abatement. In J. P. McBriarty & N. W. Henry (Eds.), Performance of protective clothing, Vol. 4 (pp. 660–674). Philadelphia: ASTM.
- Watkins, S. M. (1992). Designing movement into protective apparel. In the Proceedings of the Second International High Performance Fabrics Conference (pp. 118–132). St. Paul, MN: Industrial Fabrics Association International.
- Sawicki, J. C., Mond, C., Schwope, A. D., & Watkins, S. M. (1992). Limited-use chemical protective clothing for epa superfund activities. Environmental Protection Agency Project Summary, EPA/600/SR-92/014.
- Watkins, S. M. (1995). Clothing: The portable environment. Ames, IA: Iowa State University Press.
- Ashdown, S. P., & Watkins, S. M. (1995). Concurrent engineering in the design of protective clothing: Interfacing with equipment design. In J. S. Johnson & S. Z. Mansdorf (Eds.), Performance of protective clothing, Vol. 5 (pp. 471–485). American Society for Testing and Materials, Philadelphia.
- Watkins, S., Wormser, L., Whitley, P., & Forster, E. (1998). The design of arm pressure covers to alleviate pain in high G maneuvers. Aviation, Space, and Environmental Medicine 69 (5), 461–467.
- Watkins, S. M. (2003). Functional clothing design. In J. M. Miller, R. M. Lerner, L. B. Schiamberg, & P. M. Anderson (Eds.), Human ecology: An encyclopedia of children, families, communities, and environments. Santa Barbara, CA: ABC-Clio.
- Watkins, S.M. (2004). “Space Suits”, “Fashion, Health, and Disease”, and “Protective Clothing” (3 entries), in Encyclopedia of Clothing and Fashion, Steele, V. (ed.), New York: Charles Scribner's Sons.
- Watkins, S.M. (2010). “Functional Dress”, “Mobility in Pressurized Garments” and “Textile Design and Functional Dress” (3 entries), in Berg Encyclopedia of World Dress and Fashion: Volume 3: The United States and Canada, Tortora, P.G. (ed.), New York: Berg.

To go in References; Sarah, E., & Marie, O. (1998). Techno textiles 2: Revolutionary Fabrics for fashion and design.

== Patents ==
- US application 20070017008, Patrick Bousquet; Mark Mordecai & Julie Snedeker et al., "Two-piece protective suit for hazardous environments", published 2005-08-09
- US patent 6934970, Mark Mordecai; Julie Snedeker & Susan Watkins, "Fire protective coat with free-hanging throat tab", published 2005-08-30
- US patent 7065796, Mark Mordecai; Mike Towle & Susan Watkins, "Fire protective trousers exhibiting reduced binding", published 2006-06-27
