= New York State College of Human Ecology at Cornell University =

Statutory college located in Ithaca, New York

Coordinates: 42.4497°N 76.4790°W

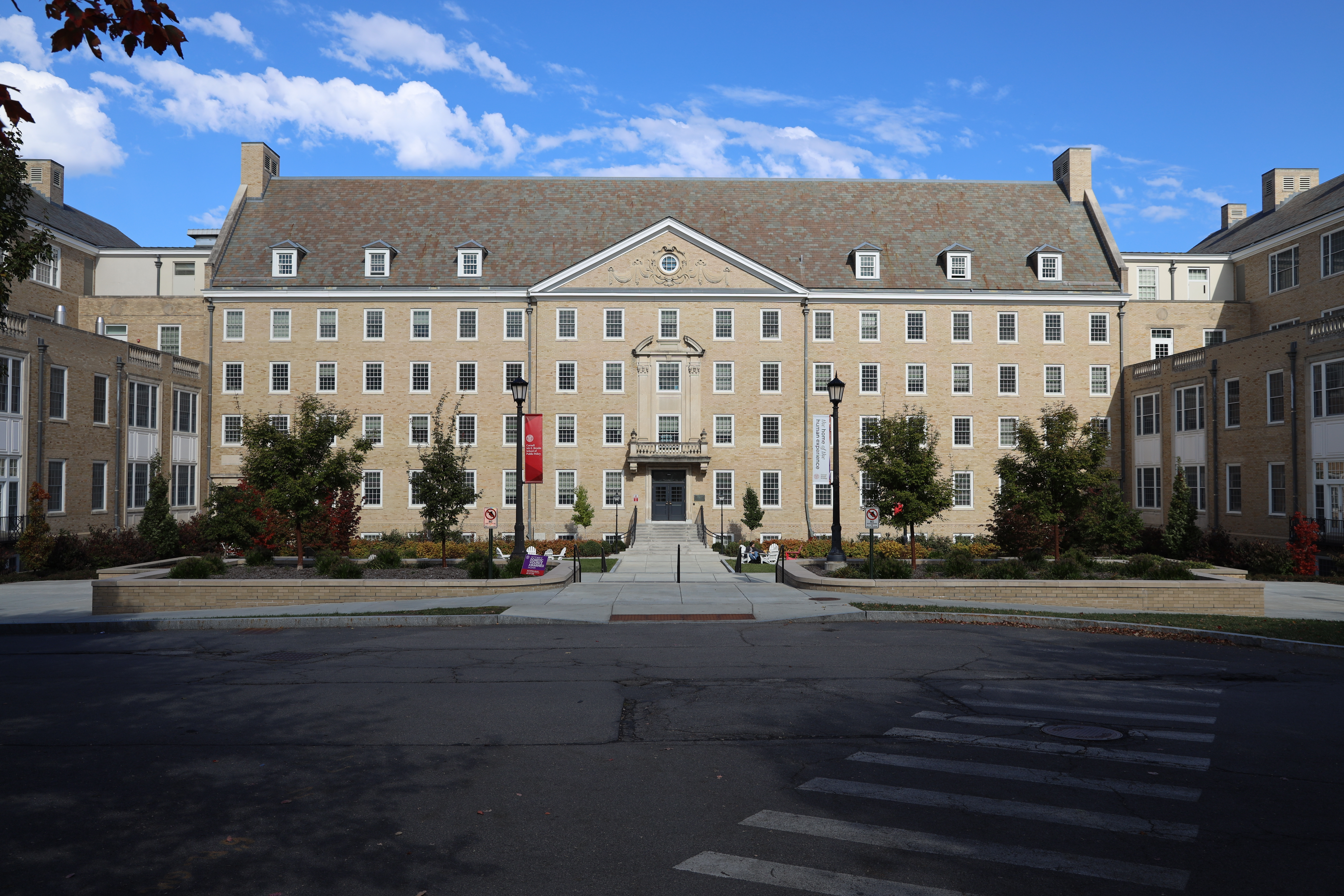
- Martha Van Rensselaer Hall, original home of The College of Human Ecology
- Type: Statutory
- Established: 1925; 101 years ago
- Affiliations: Cornell University; State University of New York
- Dean: Rachel Dunifon
- Faculty: 105 professors
- Undergraduates: 1,250
- Postgraduates: 458
- Location: Ithaca, New York, U.S.
- Website: human.cornell.edu

The New York State College of Human Ecology at Cornell University (HumEc) is a statutory college and one of four New York State contract colleges located on the Cornell University campus in Ithaca, New York. The College of Human Ecology is a compilation of study areas such as design, design thinking, consumer science, nutrition, health economics, human development and textiles, each through the perspective of human ecology.

The school was founded in 1925 as the New York State College of Home Economics, growing out of an academic department that had been started in 1907. The college was renamed to its present appelation in 1969.

The college is open to both New York State residents and to non-residents; residents pay reduced tuition rates. In 2007–2008, the HumEc total budget of $42 million included $33 million in tuition revenue and $9 million in state appropriations.

== Academics ==
The College enrolls approximately 1,250 undergraduates and 458 graduate students, and has approximately 105 professors and lecturers, and 70 research associates. Human Ecology provides a liberal arts foundation supporting career-specific preparation in a small college environment. The admitted freshman profile is in the middle 50th percentile. In 2005, the Cornell Alumni Magazine reported males represented 25 percent of College of Human Ecology 2005–06 student body.

The three academic departments comprising the College are Human Centered Design, Psychology, and the Division of Nutritional Sciences, which offer the following undergraduate majors: Design and Environmental Analysis; Fiber Science; Fashion Design, with possible options in Fashion Design and Fashion Design Management; Global and Public Health Sciences; Human Biology, Health and Society; Human Development; and Nutritional Sciences. Thirty-five to forty percent of Human Ecology students continue in professional or graduate degree programs following the completion of undergraduate degree programs.

Deans of the College of Human Ecology
Martha Van Rensselaer and Flora Rose	1924–1932
Flora Rose	1932–1940
Mary F. Henry (Acting)	1940–1941
Sarah Gibson Blanding	1941–1946
Elizabeth Lee Vincent	1946–1953
Helen G. Canoyer	1953–1968
David C. Knapp	1968–1974
Jean Failing	1974–1978
Jerome M. Ziegler	1978–1988
Francille M. Firebaugh	1988–1999
Patsy M. Brannon	1999–2004
Lisa Staiano-Coico	2004–2007
Alan Mathios	2007–2019
Rachel Dunifon	2020–Present

== History ==
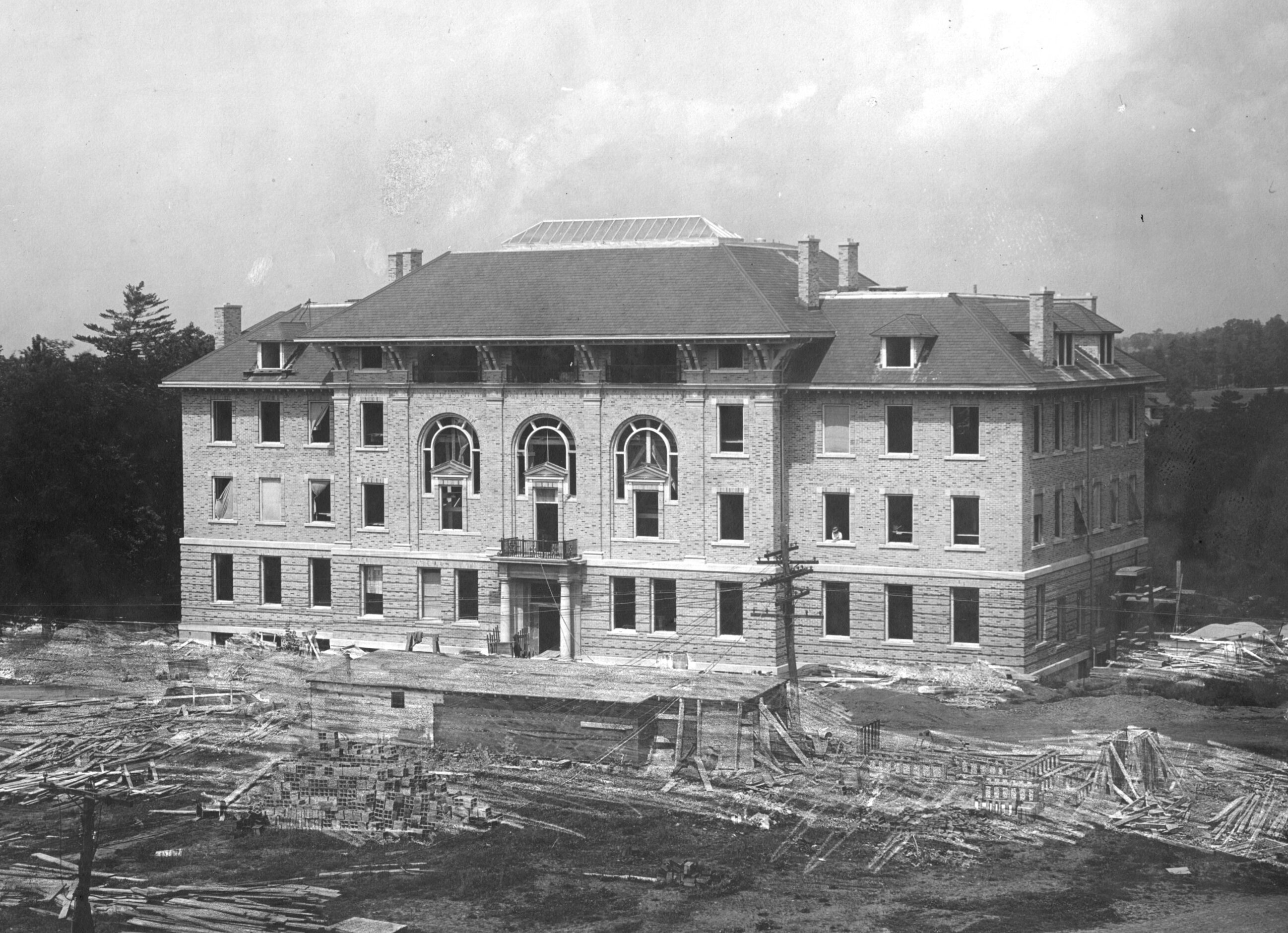
Comsotck Hall (later renamed the Computing and Communications Center) was the first home of the department of Home Economics in 1913

The home economics movement emerged toward the end of the nineteenth century. Pioneers such as Ellen Swallow Richards and Mr. and Mrs. Melvil Dewey championed home economics as a field in higher education.

From 1903 to 1907 Martha Van Rensselaer (1864–1932), a pioneer in the field of home economics, and American nutritionist Flora Rose (1874–1959), and Anna Botsford Comstock taught early home economics courses at the New York State College of Agriculture. and later co-directed the fledgling department of Home Economics. In 1914, the United States Congress passed the Smith-Lever Act to establish a system of cooperative extension services provided by land-grant universities for the purpose of educating American farmers, youth, and other groups about developments in the fields of agriculture, home economics, 4-H and other related domains. Van Rensselaer and Rose advocated for the state charter of 1925 for the New York State College of Home Economics - the first unit of its kind in the United States.

In 1929, Eleanor Roosevelt lent political influence to assist the college to obtain public funds to construct a building, later completed in 1933.

In 1969, the College was renamed the New York State College of Human Ecology. The term human ecology refers to methods regarding the study of relationships between people and natural and constructed environments.

Requests for appropriations, budgets, estimates, and expenditures has remained under the management and control of the State University of New York, and the college is therefore subject to the financial supervision of the SUNY trustees. In this respect, the college is fundamentally a part of Cornell's land-grant mandate of providing state funds for training in "practical" fields that assist the economy of the state.

== Facilities ==
1. Human Ecology Building; 2. MVR Hall; 3. MVR East; 4. MVR West; 5. The Commons

In 1933, the College was housed in Martha Van Rensselaer Hall (MVR), located at 116 Reservoir Avenue in Ithaca. The Georgian Revival style brick building was designed by architect William Haugaard of the Dormitory Authority of the State of New York.

In 1968, architect Ulrich Franzen designed an addition on the north side MVR Hall. The expansion provided studio and laboratory space for faculty and students. In 2003, Dean Patsy Brannon presided over the completion of a west wing addition to MVR Hall, providing space for the Division of Nutritional Sciences, including a human metabolic research unit as well as an interactive distance-learning classroom.

Meanwhile, MVR Hall's north wing had been urgently evacuated in 2001 due to structural problems, and was demolished in 2005. In 2011, a new 89,000-square foot facility designed by Gruzen Samton and IBI Group was completed to provide a parking garage, a three-story building, and a commons adjacent to the existing building. In 2015, the Green Parking Council certified the parking structure a green garage.

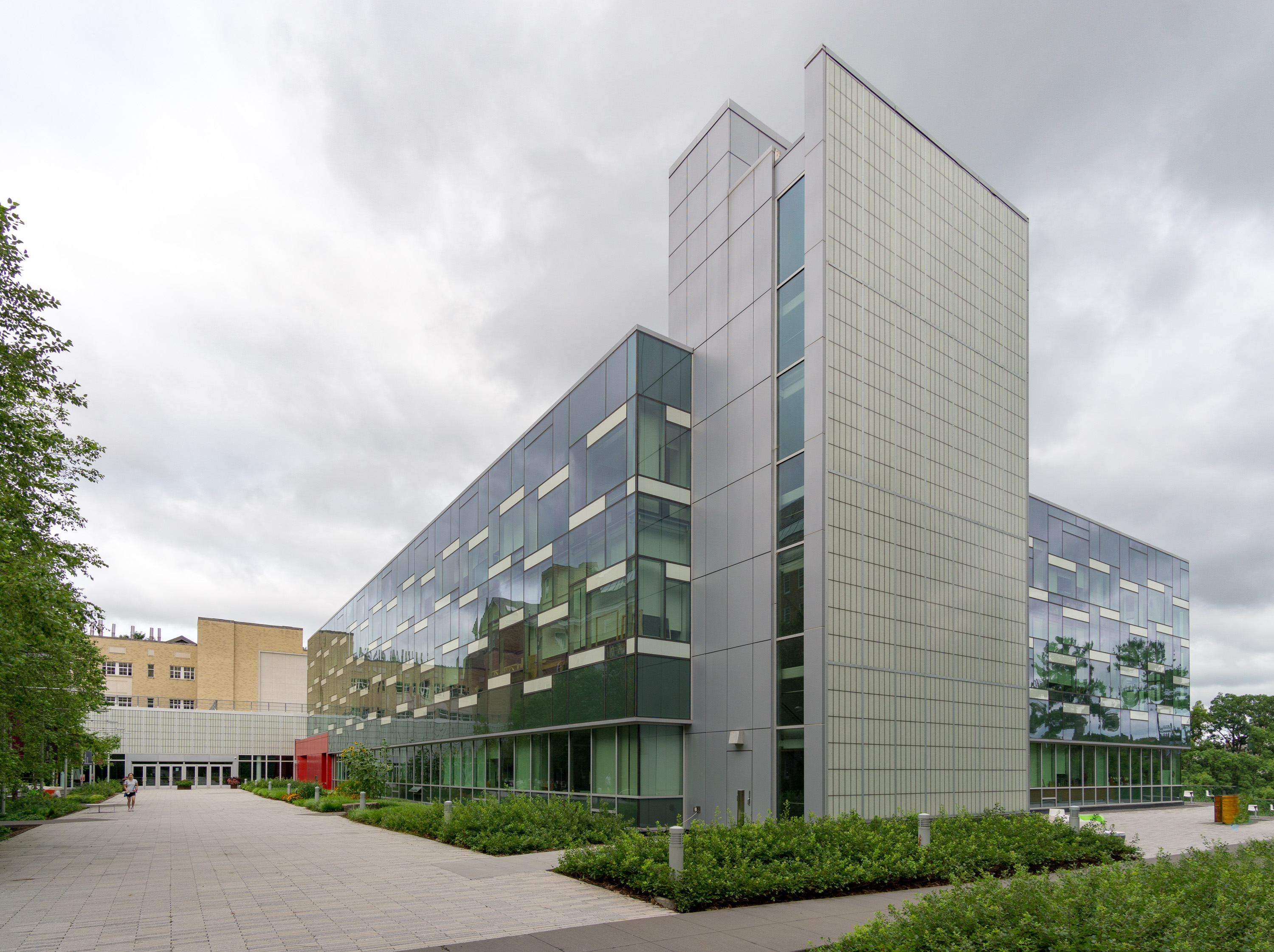
Human Ecology Building

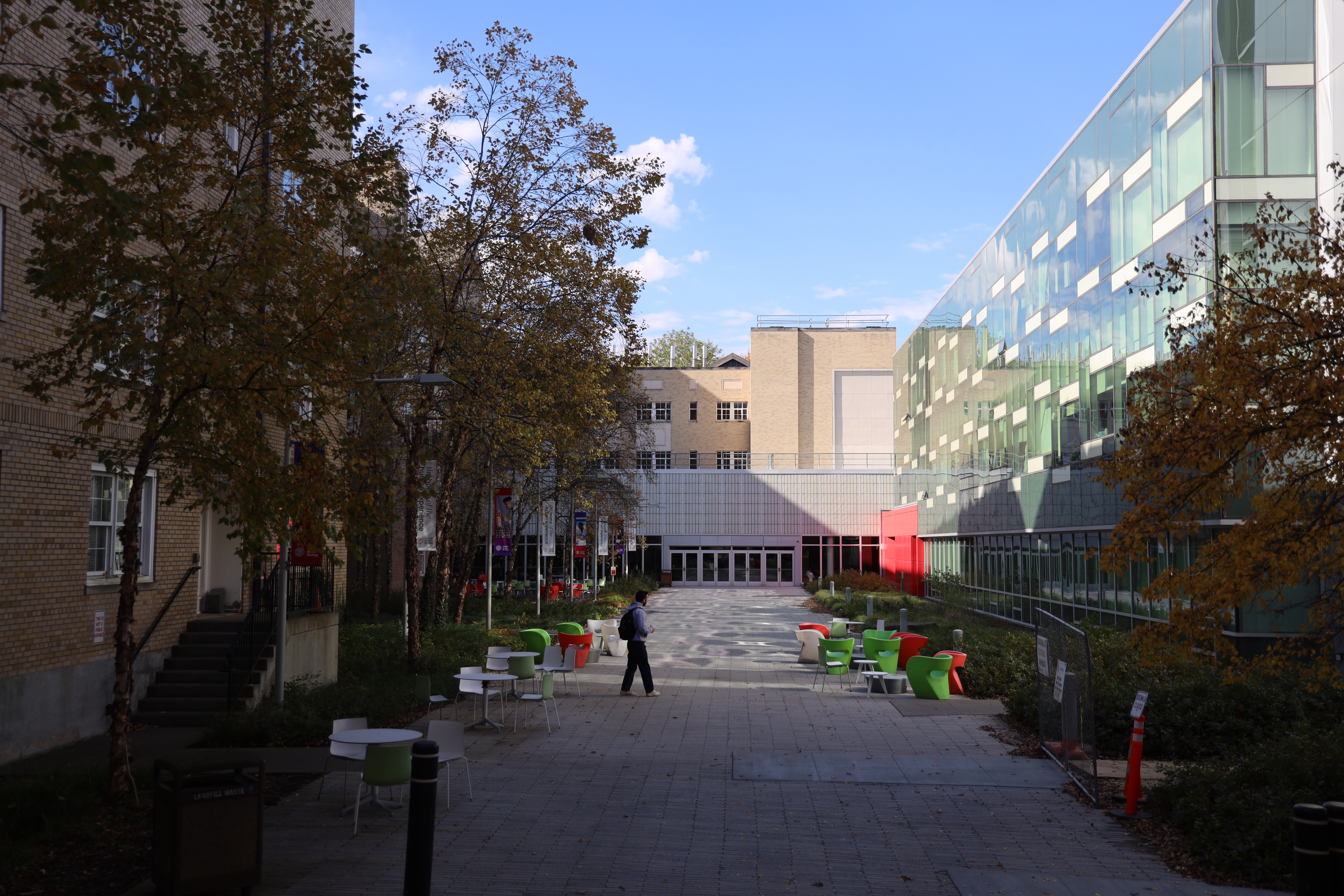
The Commons

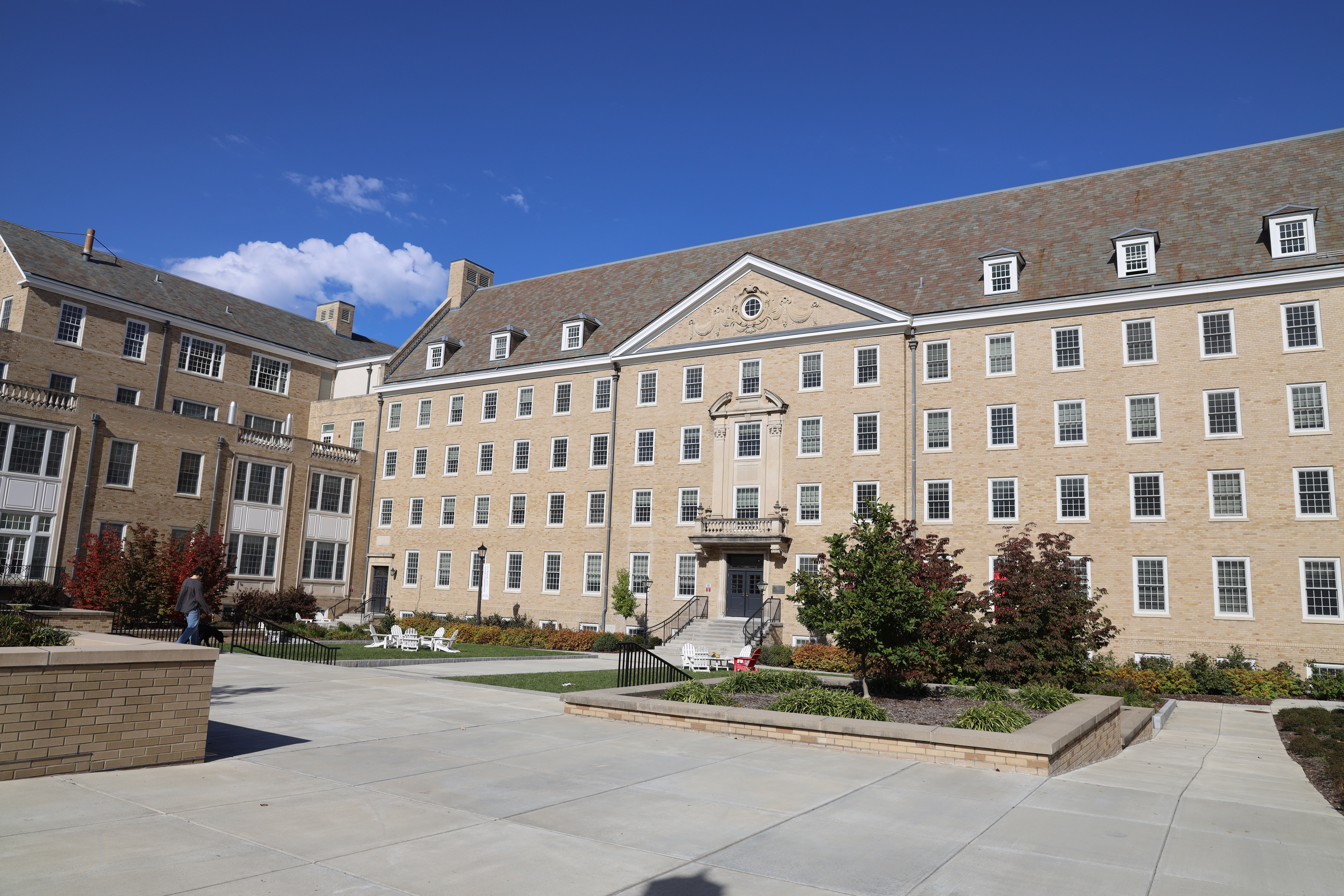
MVR Hall

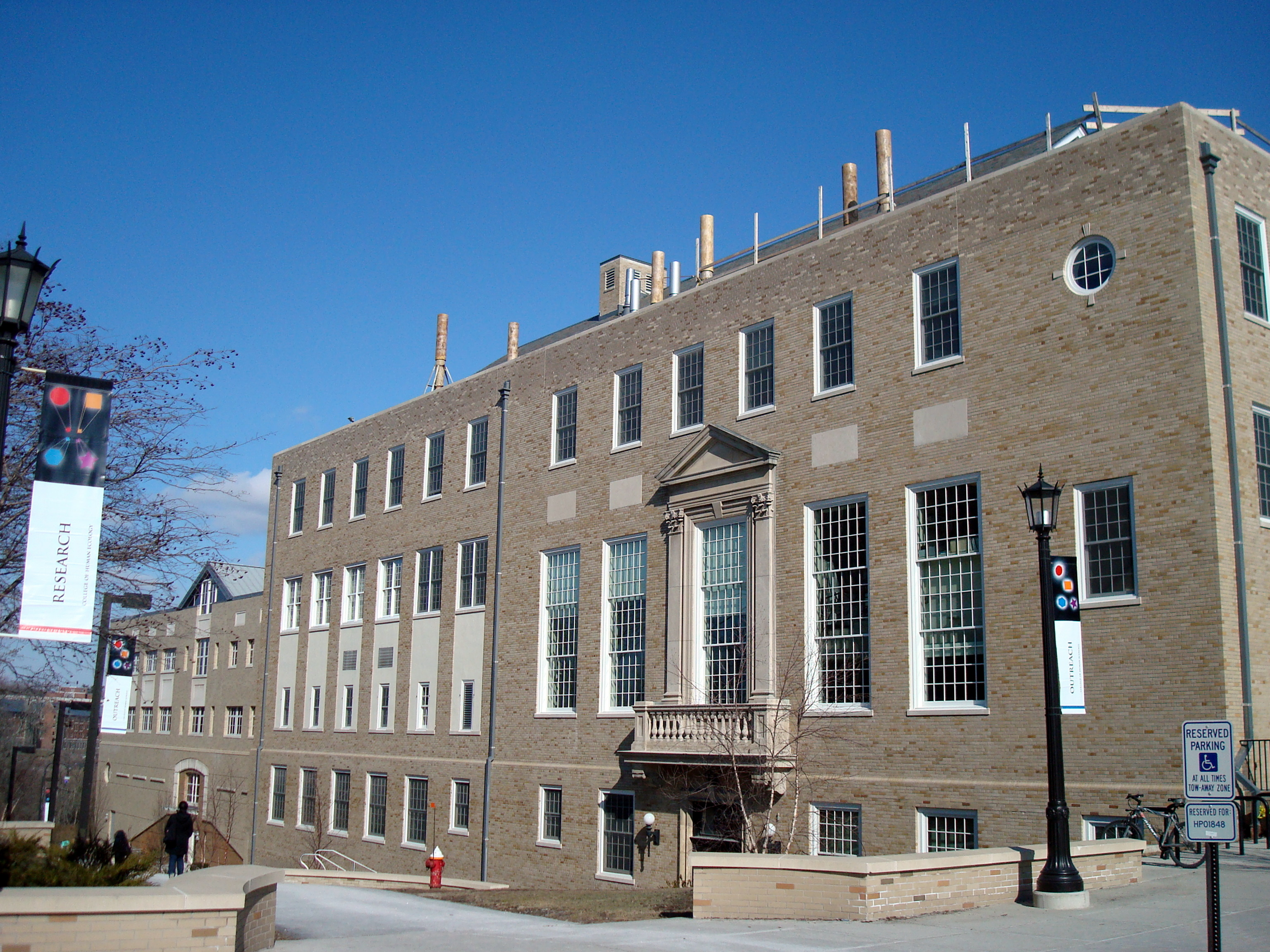
MVR West

== Notable alumni ==
- Parker W. Borg, professor and former U.S. ambassador to Mali and Iceland
- Mandy Cohen, physician and former director of the Centers for Disease Control and Prevention
- Sandra Fluke, attorney, political candidate, and activist
- Raja Jaafar, Crown prince of Perak, Malaysia
- Alice H. Lichtenstein, professor and nutrition researcher
- James Pitaro, chairman, ESPN and The Walt Disney Company's sports content division
- Nicole Alexander-Scott, infectious disease specialist
- Judith S. Stern, co-founder, American Obesity Association
- Mark Whitacre, highest-level corporate executive in U.S. history to become an FBI whistleblower

== Notable faculty ==
- Beulah Blackmore
- Urie Bronfenbrenner
- Joan Jacobs Brumberg
- Stephen Ceci
- Dora Erway
- Karl Pillemer
- Robert Sternberg
- Susan Margaret Watkins
- Ritch Savin-Williams
