= Flora Rose =

American scientist, nutritionist, and educator (1874–1959)

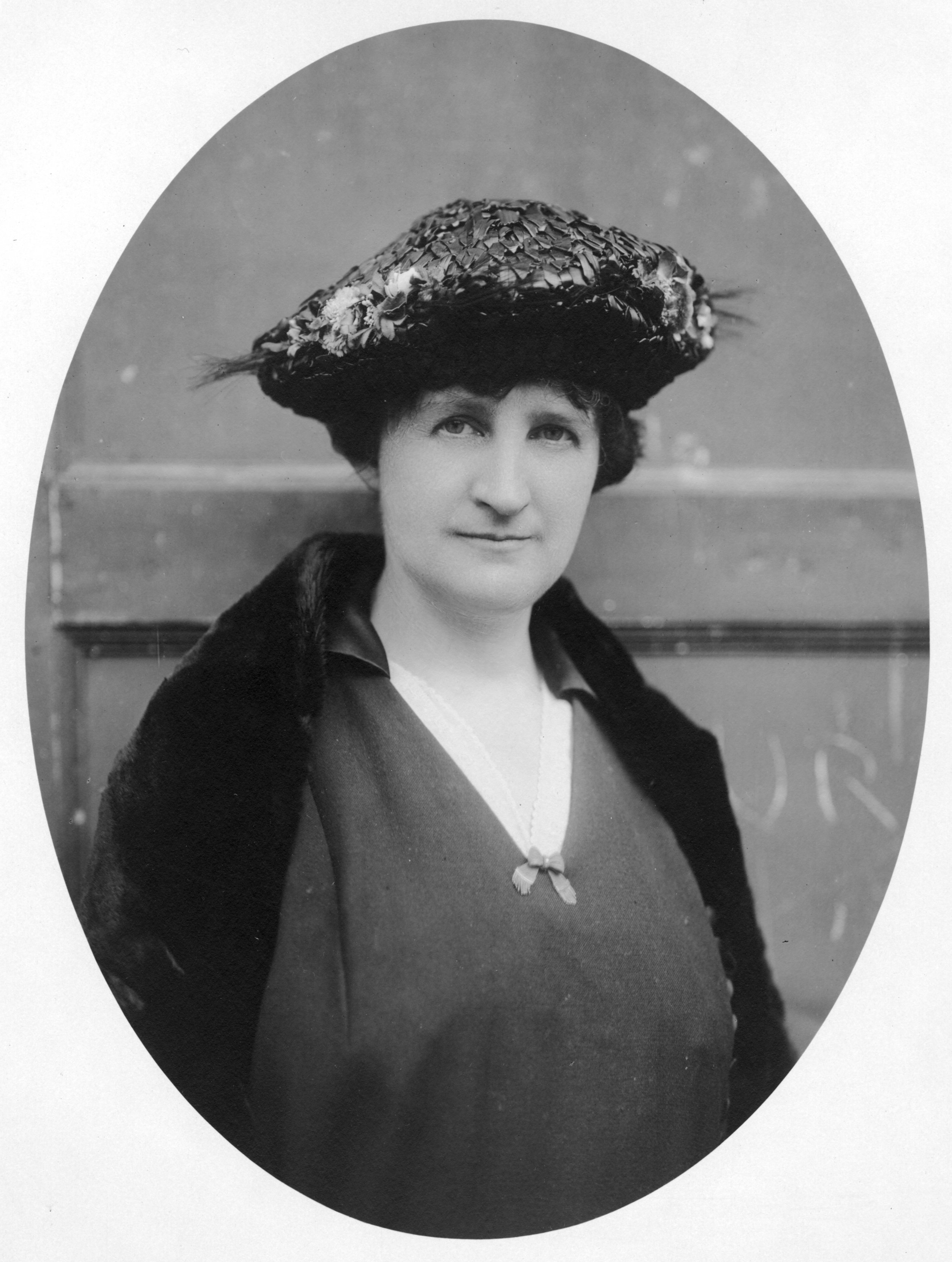
- Flora Rose c. 1916
- Born: October 13, 1874
- Died: July 25, 1959 (aged 84)
- Education: Kansas State Agricultural College
- Occupations: Scientist; nutritionist; professor of Home Economics
- Employer: Cornell University
- Partners: Martha Van Rensselaer; Claribel Nye

Flora Rose (October 13, 1874 – July 25, 1959) was an American scientist, nutritionist, and co-director of what would become New York State College of Human Ecology. Rose, along with Martha Van Rensselaer, was named the first full-time female professor at Cornell University.

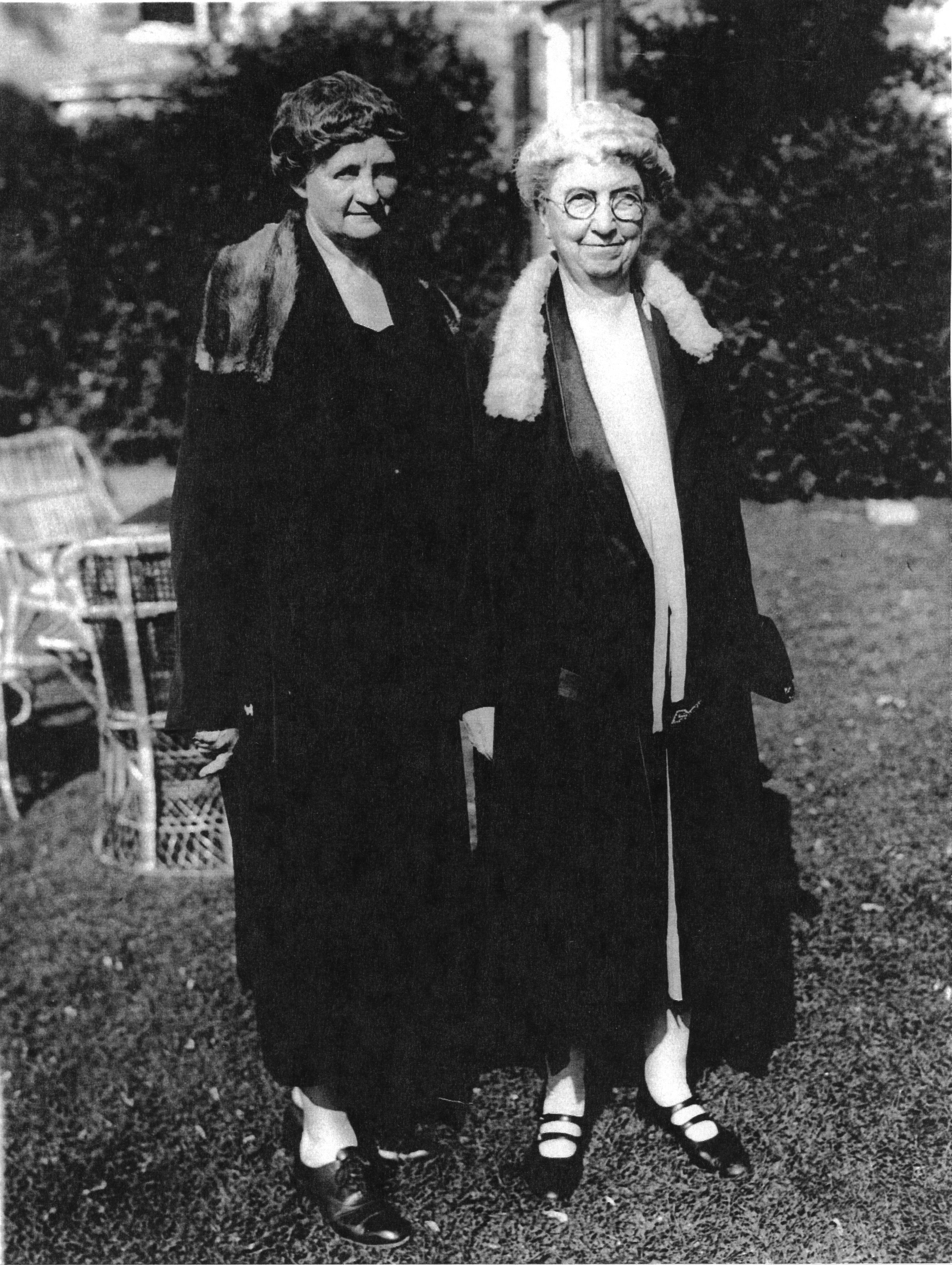
Flora Rose, on left, with co-director and domestic partner, Martha Van Rennselaer, featured on right.

== Biography ==
Rose graduated with her BA from Kansas State Agricultural College. After her graduation, she wrote letters to Stanford University and Cornell University proposing they initiate a home economics program. Cornell accepted her proposal and hired her to begin the burgeoning home economics department alongside Martha Van Rensselaer. She and Martha Van Rensselaer were often “collectively referred to as Miss Van Rose” and they lived together from 1908 til 1932 when Van Rensselaer died; they were equal partners in their work, taking an academic, scholarly approach to the matters of personal and family life.

Aside from her obligations to Cornell, Rose held the position of deputy director of the Food Conservation Bureau of the New York State Food Commission. In this position she aided in leading research and development of production of cereals that were low-cost and vitamin-enriched.

== Honors ==
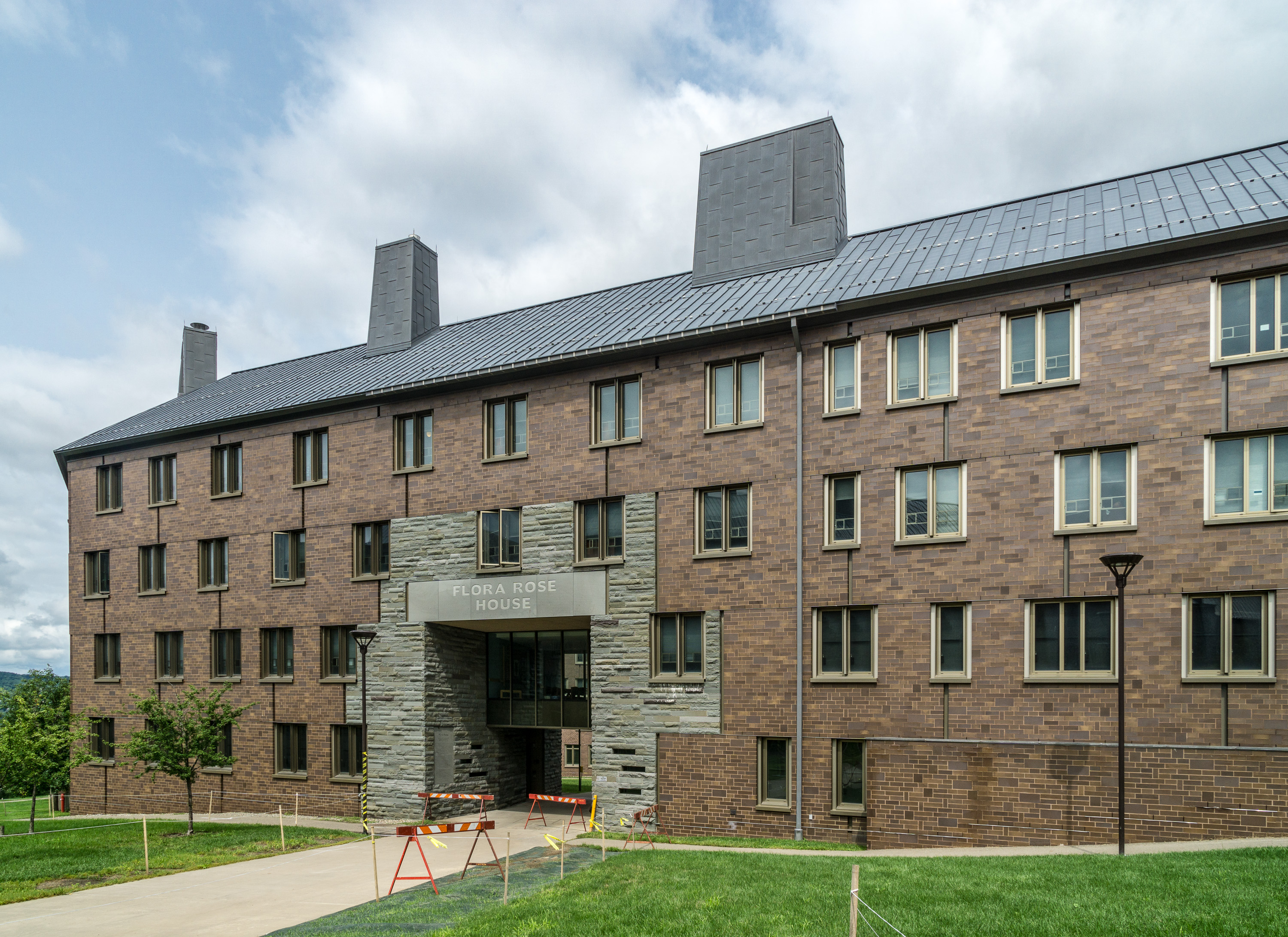
Cornell's Flora Rose House

Fellow faculty members penned this memorial statement in memory of her contribution:

“The abiding picture is one of vividness and warmth, of poise and strength, of open-door hospitality, of instant and personal interest and of loyal friendship.”

Eulogies for Van Rensselaer all mention Rose as her partner and celebrate their professional and personal relationship as one worthy of emulation. Many accounts from friends and colleagues demonstrate that they saw Van Rensselaer and Rose’s relationship as one that exemplified the kind of partnership and professionalism that they advocated for through their work in the Home Economics courses.

A residence hall on West Campus was named for Rose in 2008.

King Albert I of Belgium awarded Van Rensselaer and Rose the Order of the Crown for leading an effort to provide food relief to malnourished school-age children in Belgium.

== Publications ==
- The Laundry, 1909
- Milk : a cheap food, 1917
- Letters of Flora Rose and Martha Van Rensselaer from Belgium, 1923, 1923
- Pioneers in home economics, 1948
