= Martha Van Rensselaer =

American home economics educator (1864–1932)

Martha van Rensselaer
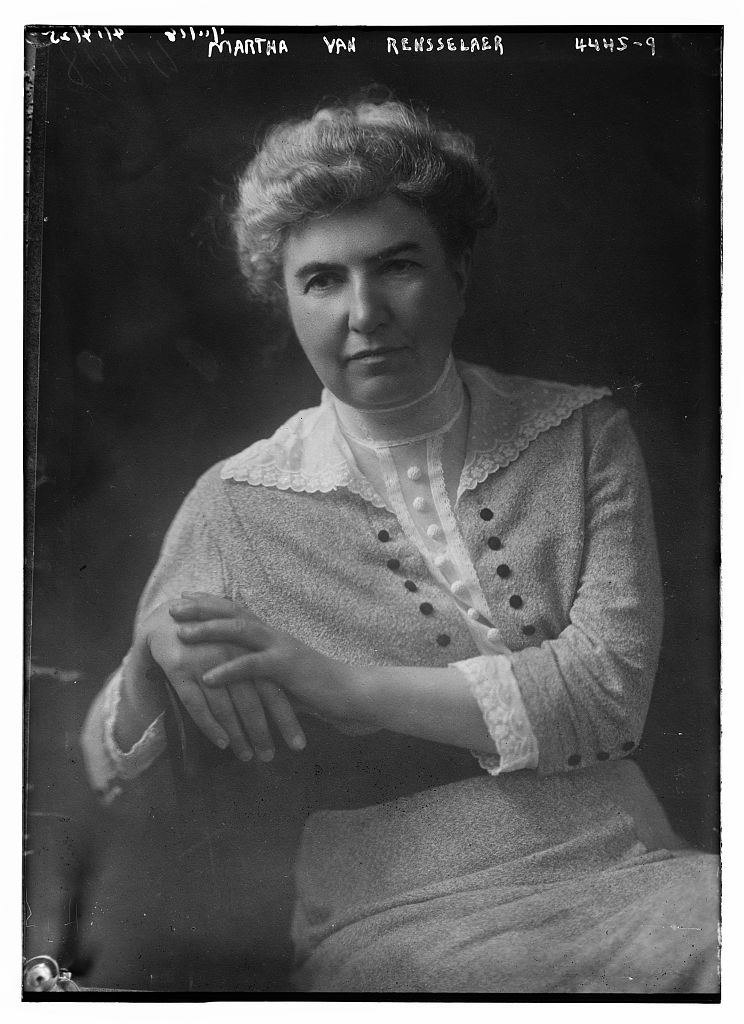
- Van Rensselaer in 1918
- Born: June 21, 1864; Randolph, New York, U.S.
- Died: May 26, 1932 (aged 67)
- Education: Cornell University 1909
- Occupations: Educator, school commissioner, author, editor
- Known for: New York State College of Human Ecology
- Partner: Flora Rose

Martha van Rensselaer (June 21, 1864 – May 26, 1932) was a founding co-director of the College of Home Economics, which led to the establishment of the New York State College of Human Ecology in Ithaca, New York. Van Rensselaer served as an educator and proponent of the application of knowledge to improved quality of life in the home. She called the field of study “domestic science” and focused on key aspects of homemaking.

== Biography ==
Van Rensselaer was born on June 21, 1864, in Randolph, New York.

Her mother was a participant in the women's suffrage and temperance movements, and from her mother, Van Rensselaer learned about the potential of women to influence society.

Van Rensselaer graduated from high school and became a teacher. She was elected commissioner of Cattaraugus County, New York, a position typically held by men, from 1893 to 1899. Prior to this appointment, Van Rensselaer was asked to promise she wouldn’t get married – a common requirement of women at the time – but refused. She received the position regardless. She never married, but went on to share a home with her romantic partner Flora Rose.

In 1900, Liberty Hyde Bailey invited Van Rensselaer to organize a cooperative extension education program for women in New York State's rural areas. Under the direction of Van Rensselaer's, the program enrolled over 20,000 women in under five years. The curriculum sought to translate advancements to agriculture to farm life. The program’s success was noted by Susan B. Anthony, who wrote to Van Rensselaer in 1905, to inquire about the program "in getting farmers' wives to talk."

=== New York State College of Human Ecology ===
Martha van Rensselaer arrived at Cornell University in 1900 to organize a reading course for farmers’ wives.

Van Rensselaer offered home economics courses in 1907. Two years later, Van Rensselaer received her A.B. from Cornell, and in 1911, she and Flora Rose held the position of professor, and in 1912, they co-directed a fledgling department of Home Economics, out of the New York State College of Agriculture. She and Flora Rose were often “collectively referred to as Miss Van Rose” and they lived together from 1908 til 1932, when Van Rensselaer died.

Rose provided expertise in nutrition education, and Van Rensselaer was the change agent. These activities gained the attention of the women’s rights movement. In 1925, women suffrage leader Carrie Chapman Catt wrote to Van Rensselaer, "I regard your department as the most forward in the entire country." Van Rensselaer discussed topics with her students in regards to new theory on marriage and worked in a scholarly manner “at revealing and strengthening the connections between the professional and the personal”. Her vision for a home economics movement engaged Ida Tarbell and Eleanor Roosevelt. Roosevelt visited Van Rensselaer on campus to advocate for an expansion of the concepts of home to include community, nation, and world.

Under the co-directorship of Van Rensselaer and Rose, in 1919, the department of Home Economics became the School of Home Economics, and in 1925, the New York State Legislature chartered the New York State College of Home Economics. Although Van Rensselaer died in 1932, her contributions left a framework for the School of Home Economics to later become the New York State College of Human Ecology in 1969. Eulogies for Van Rensselaer all mention Rose as her partner and celebrate their professional and personal relationship as one worthy of emulation. Many accounts from friends and colleagues demonstrate that they saw Van Rensselaer and Rose’s relationship as one that exemplified the kind of partnership and professionalism that they advocated for through their work in the Home Economics courses.

Since 1933, The College of Human Ecology has been located in Martha van Rensselaer Hall (MVR).

=== Additional Work ===
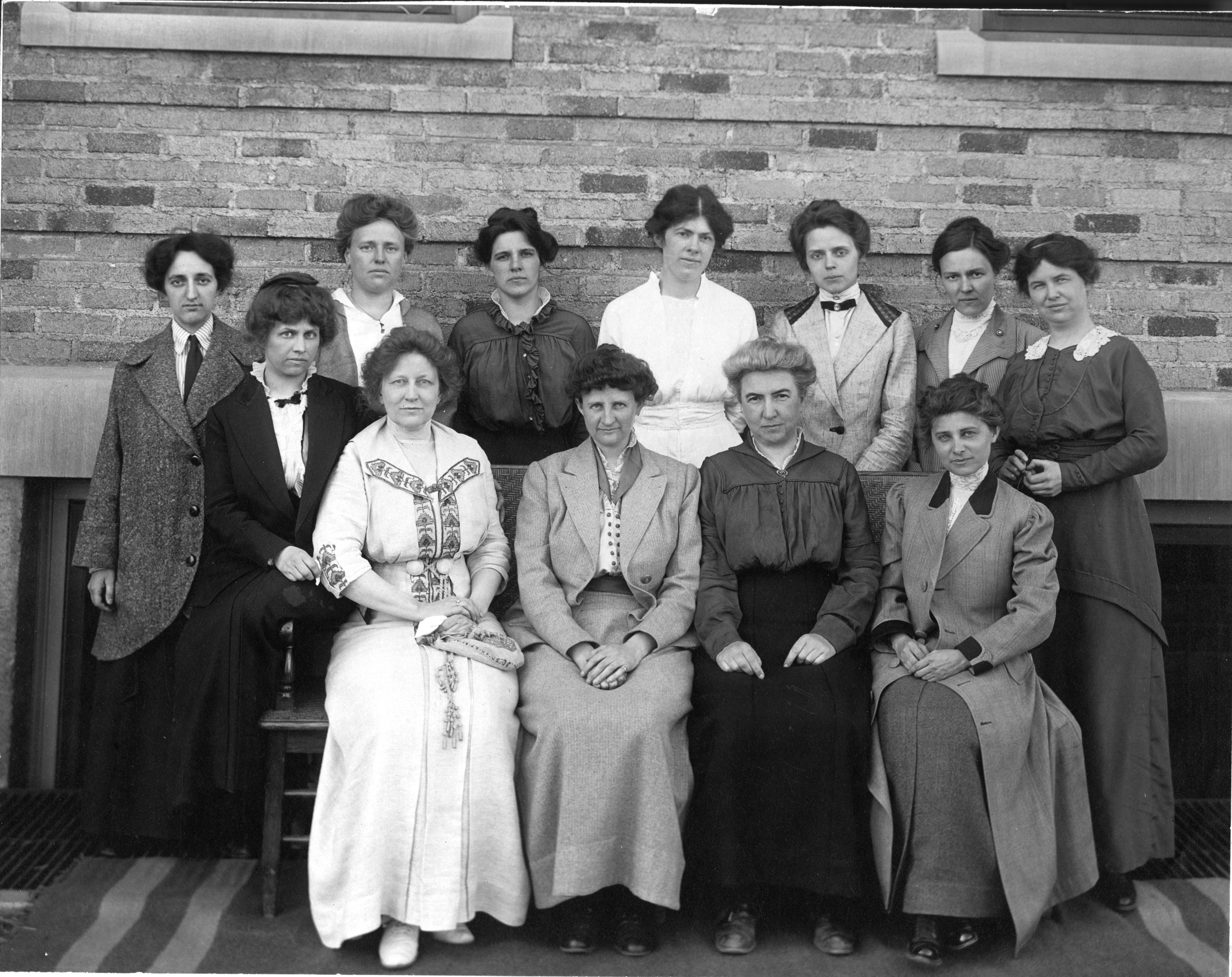
Faculty of the Cornell department of home economics in 1914. Martha van Rensselaer is in the bottom row, second from the right.

During World War I, Van Rensselaer directed the Home Conservation Division of the United States Food Administration. From 1914 to 1916, she served as president of the American Home Economics Association.

In 1919, Van Rensselaer co-wrote with Flora Rose and Helen Canon A Manual of Home Making on home management. From 1920 to 1926, Van Rensselaer was the home economics editor for popular magazine Delineator and published articles in Ladies Home Journal.

== Professional recognition ==
In 1923, the League of Women Voters recognized Van Rensselaer as one of the twelve most important women in America.

Herbert Hoover appointed Van Rensselaer to several key federal commissions, and she assisted with international outreach initiatives. In 1923, then-Secretary of Commerce Hoover sent Van Rensselaer on behalf of the nation to Belgium to survey nutrition of school children and educational needs of women, and for her efforts, she received from King Albert I of Belgium the Cross of Chevalier of the Order of the Crown.

In 1930, Van Rensselaer participated in a White House Conference on Child Health and Protection, which set a Progressive Era agenda for youth health, social policy, and education, and the drafting the Children's Charter, a national declaration on child rearing. In 1931, she participated in the President's Conference on Home Building and Home Ownership, and she advocated for poverty-stricken urban laborers.

=== Martha van Rensselaer Hall ===
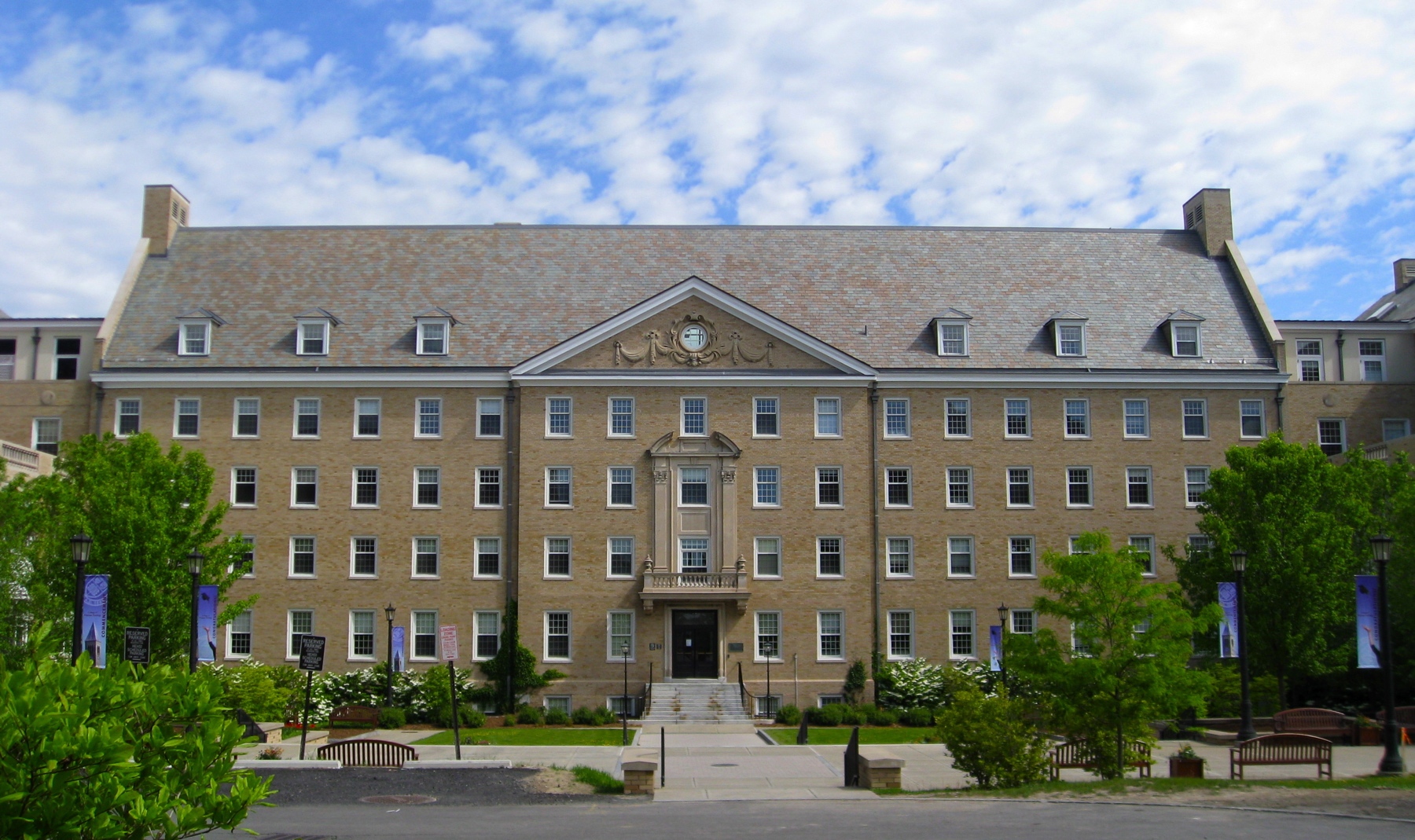
Martha van Rensselaer Hall.

When Van Rensselaer died in 1932, Herbert Hoover wrote in part, "Her passing will bring a sense of personal loss to thousands, from whom her quiet devotion to every cause, looking to the well being of children and to the enrichment of the life of women, had evoked their warm affection and their deep respect. The nation has lost a great citizen."

Eulogies for Van Rensselaer all mention Flora Rose as her domestic partner and celebrate their professional and personal relationship.

New York State funded the construction Martha van Rensselaer Hall to house the New York State College of Human Ecology. The building was dedicated in 1932, shortly after Van Rensselaer] death. On the occasion of the dedication, co-director Flora Rose said, "Martha van Rensselaer conceived of home economics education as a means by which women's mind could be trained, their capacities released, and their deepest desires satisfied through growth in understanding. As we lay the cornerstone of this great building, it is not its material expression in brick and stone and steel that I would have you consider. Rather it is to its significance as a symbol of new and vital forces arising to meet strenuous modern problems."

== Publications ==
- Household bacteriology, 1913
- A manual of home-making, 1919
