= Mary Caldwell =

Mary Caldwell may refer to:

- Mary Cardwell Dawson (1894–1962), American musician and teacher
- Mary Gwendolin Caldwell, Marquise des Monstiers-Mérinville (1863–1909), American philanthropist and socialite
- Mary Hay (actress) (1901–1957), American dancer, musical comedy- and silent screen actress, playwright, and Ziegfeld girl; born Mary Hay Caldwell
- Mary Letitia Caldwell (1890–1972), American chemist
- Mary Tourtel (1874–1948), née Caldwell, British artist and creator of the comic strip Rupert Bear
