= Spohn =

Spohn may refer to:

== People ==
- Adelaide Spohn (1886–1968), American nutritionist
- Cassia Spohn, American criminologist
- Clay Spohn (1898–1977) American visual artist, educator
- Daniel Spohn, American mixed martial artist
- Friedrich August Wilhelm Spohn, German philologist
- Herbert Spohn, German mathematician
- Philip Howard Spohn, Canadian physician
- Walter G. Spohn, American plastic surgeon
- Wolfgang Spohn (born 1950), German philosopher

== Companies ==
- Spohn Ranch, a skatepark company based in Industry, California

== Geography ==
- Mount Spohn, a mountain in Antarctica
