= Gibilisco =

Gibilisco is a surname. Notable people with the surname include:

- Giuseppe Gibilisco (born 1979), Italian coach and former pole vaulter
- Joe Gibilisco (born 1954), Italian former professional boxer
- Laura Gibilisco (born 1986), Italian hammer thrower
- Stan Gibilisco (1955-2020), American nonfiction writer
