= Grace M. Sparkes =

American booster

Grace Marion Sparkes
- Born: January 21, 1893; Lead, South Dakota
- Died: October 22, 1963 (aged 70)
- Years active: 1910-1963
- Employer: Yavapai County Chamber of Commerce

Grace M. Sparkes (January 21, 1893-October 22, 1963) was an influential booster in Arizona. As a secretary of the Yavapai County and Bisbee Chambers of Commerce, she managed community projects and tourism. During the Great Depression, she implemented federal and municipal projects employing Yavapai County citizens. After leaving Yavapai County, she was instrumental in the creation of the Coronado National Memorial.

== Early life ==
Grace Marion Sparkes was born on January 21, 1893, in Lead, South Dakota, to Thomas Jefferson "T.J." Sparkes and Mary Ann Sparkes (née Martin). Grace was one of four Sparkes children. Mary Ann had previously been married and widowed; it is unknown what happened to her three children from the first marriage. Sparkes was known by her childhood nickname, "Babe", throughout her life. During her childhood, the Sparkes family briefly lived in Alaska.

In 1906, the Sparkes family moved to Arizona as "boomers", or people "always on the lookout for the big chance, the ground floor, the inside track..." There, T.J. Sparkes, Sr. bought several mines, notably the Sioux Silver and Lead Mine. In 1930, he was elected Arizona State Mining Inspector.

Sparkes converted to Catholicism at a young age. In 1910, Sparkes graduated from St. Joseph's Academy, a Catholic girls' school in Prescott. She then studied business and clerical studies at Lamson Business College in Phoenix.

== Career in Yavapai County ==
By 1913, she was secretary/manager of the Yavapai County Chamber of Commerce and the county's Immigration Commissioner. She held the immigration commissioner position until 1945. Sparkes also served on the Arizona State Board of Welfare and the Northern Arizona State Fair Association.

While working with the Yavapai County Chamber of Commerce, Sparkes was credited with greatly building the Prescott Frontier Days rodeo. She became known as "the girl who bosses 200 bronco busters." She was also influential in developing rodeo rules, many of which are still used. Sparkes is credited with developing Prescott's slogan, the "Cowboy Capital of the World."

In 1920, Sparkes led a group of Prescott citizens to raise funds for the Hassayampa Hotel Company, which opened in 1927.

In 1921_{,} Sparkes co-founded the Smoki Tribe of Prescott ceremonial dances. The Smoki was a men's organization that imitated Native American ceremonies. Sparkes was the marketer for the Smoki and their activities, describing the Smoki dances as "adapted to the mood of the white man and given in a manner which [left] no offense whatsoever from the standpoint of the Indian." Sparkes was made an honorary member of the Smoki people. Her success in marketing the activities brought it to the national interest. In 1924, the event was attended by Governor George W. P. Hunt, and Sparkes, on a trip to Washington, D.C., conferred honorary membership on Calvin Coolidge. The national interest in the Smoki Sparkes garnered criticism of their activities as well; also in 1924, the Los Angeles Times criticized the Smoki as a "highly offensive, objectionable and indefensible exhibition of bad taste."

=== Relief work in the Great Depression ===
Due to the excellent state of Prescott's tourism, the Great Depression did not fully reach the town until the spring of 1930. As the effects presented themselves, Sparkes endeavored to decrease the impact of the economic crisis on Yavapai County. She was instrumental in creating projects funding unemployed people throughout the county.

In 1930, Sparkes advocated for voters to endorse Proposition 108, authorizing road resurfacing, which she claimed would increase employment. She also encouraged all Prescott businessmen to employ at least one unemployed citizen for at least one day during the first week of November. In mid-November, she announced 250 jobs for unemployed Prescott civilians working on municipal projects. By 1932, Sparkes was the local chairman in charge of relief projects. In this position, she implemented federal and municipal projects.

In November 1934, she was named chairman of the Yavapai County Civil Works Administration. In just twelve days to meet the December 1 deadline, she worked to organize and obtain funding for nine construction projects. When funds ran low, she worked to show Washington that the projects were so unique a special dispensation should be made to continue them. However, the whole project was terminated by congressional action in February 1934. In April 1934, the Federal Emergency Relief Administration was established in place of the Civil Works Administration. Although Sparkes had been unjustly criticized in a national scandal regarding the misuse of CWA funds and other irregularities, she agreed to continue her work coordinating local relief.

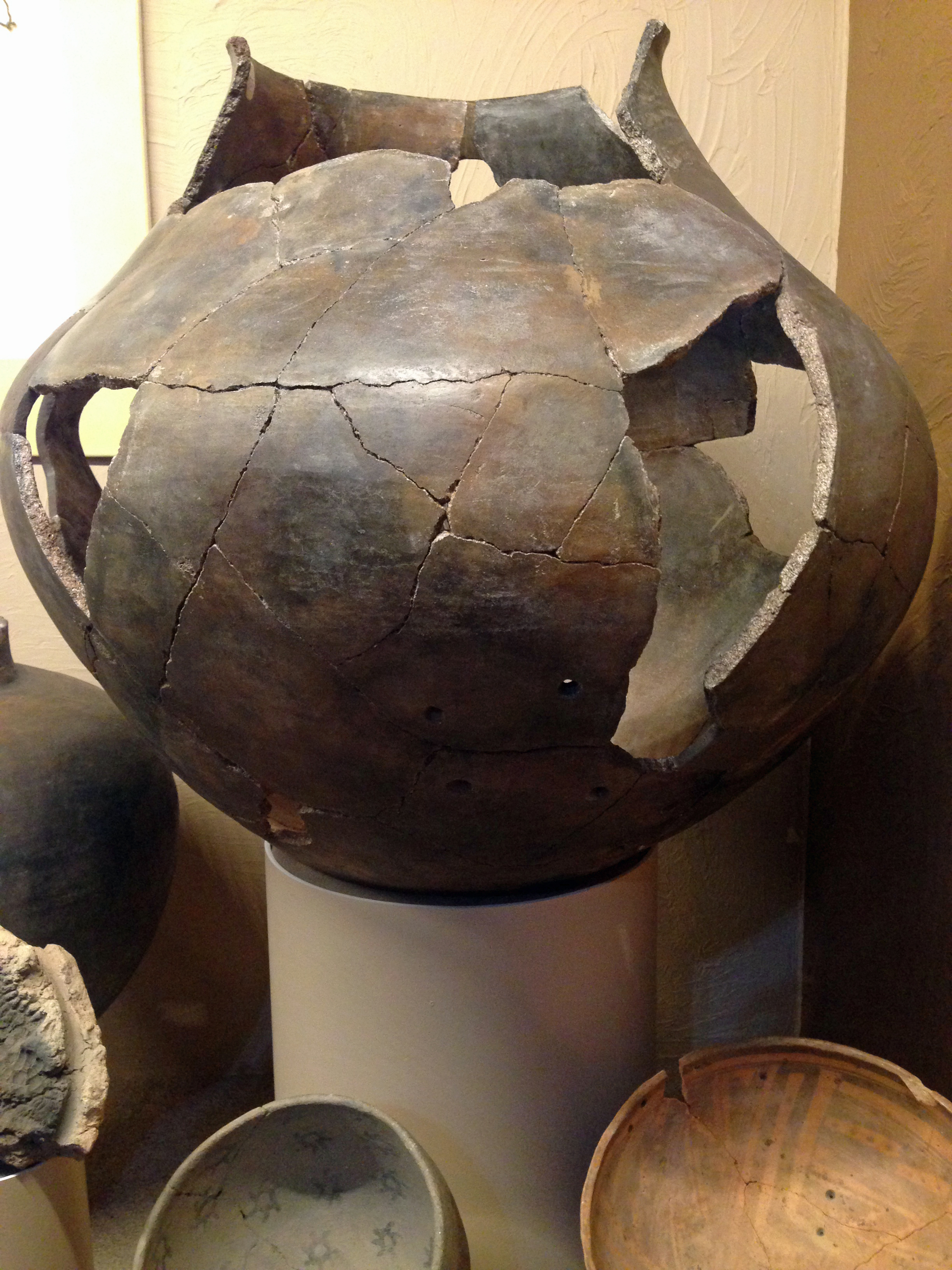
Artifact in the visitors' center at Tuzigoot National Monument. Sparkes obtained funding for people who were unable to do manual labor to prepare and assemble artifacts.

In 1930, Sparkes was appointed to the Chamber of Commerce's new Archaeological Committee, created to study, preserve, and promote Yavapai County's archaeological resources. This project hoped to identify archaeological sites to excavate, bringing in heritage tourism. They hoped to provide short-term economic benefits to workers and long-term tourism revenue. In 1933, Sparkes secured FERA funds for a project excavating, studying, and investigating the Tuzigoot prehistoric pueblo on United Verde Copper Company land and the construction of a museum. Sparkes also secured CWA funding for people who could not do heavier manual labor. A laboratory staff of women and older workers, mostly from the Cottonwood and Clarksdale Hispanic communities, cleaned, repaired, and documented over 150 pottery vessels.

In 1934, when the Arizona legislature decided not to fund an exhibit for the Century of Progress exhibition, Sparkes raised funds and built an exhibit herself.

=== Other work in Yavapai County ===
Sparkes was very interested in roads and road movement. Many scenic roads through the Southwest were successful due to her work. Sparkes was instrumental in developing Interstate 10.

In the 1930s, Sparkes successfully campaigned for more land to be added to the Montezuma Castle National Monument.

In 1935, Sparkes, along with Sharlot Hall and Yavapai leaders Sam and Viola Jimulla, convinced the federal government to designate 75 acres (30 ha) of land to be a reservation for the Yavapai people. It was the first reservation solely for the Yavapai in the state.

== Later life ==
=== Creation of Coronado National Memorial ===
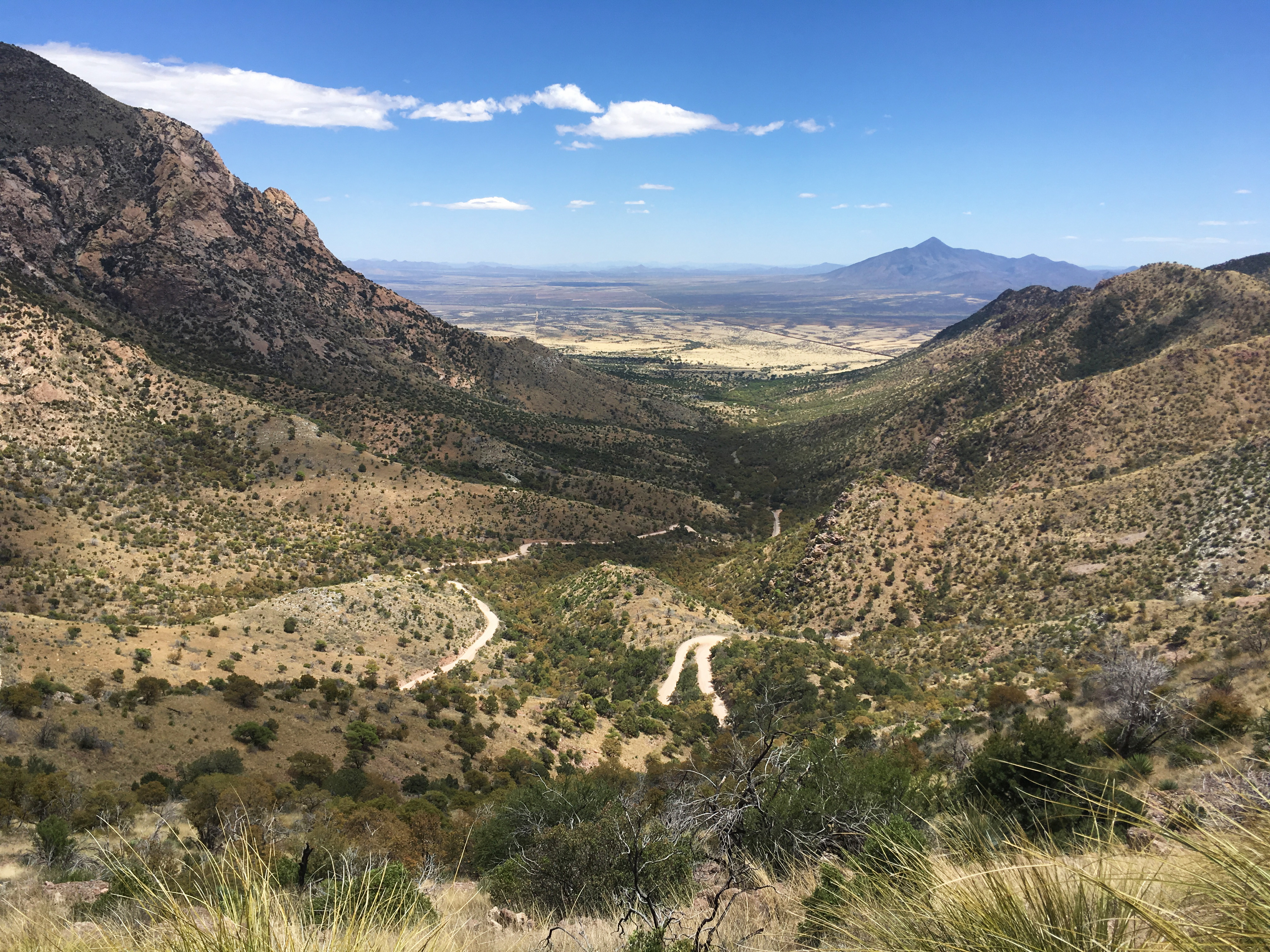
Coronado National Memorial

In 1938, Sparkes was involved in a dispute between the "old and new guards" at the Chamber of Commerce. She left the organization and began working with Yavapai Associates, an organization financed through the Yavapai County Board of Supervisors, which disbanded in 1945. Shortly after it closed, she moved to the State of Texas mine in Montezuma Canyon, which she had inherited when her father died in 1938. In 1946, mineral production at the mine stopped.

After moving to Montezuma Canyon, Sparkes became more involved in the proposal to create the Coronado National Park. She focused on the economic benefits of the park in Southeastern Arizona for all except the miners (a group she included herself in). By the end of 1950, Sparkes had become the chair of the Bisbee Chamber of Commerce National Parks and Monuments Committee.

The park was established in 1952. When funding began in 1954, Sparkes rented a house in the State of Texas mine to house the park's superintendent. Facilities and personnel remained at the State of Texas until 1960.

As the chairman of the Arizona Coronado Monument Commission and also served as the chairman of the Bisbee Chamber of Commerce National Parks and Monuments committee, she was involved in the proposal of the park and instrumental in the park's creation.

=== Death ===
In 1955, Sparkes was hired by the National Park Service as a seasonal caretaker. She was later promoted to Ranger/Historian. Sparkes either retired or was furloughed for a month in 1963. It is unknown if she intended to return to work at the park, as she died on October 22, 1963.

Although Sparkes had begun proceedings for the National Park Service to acquire the State of Texas mine, they were unable to come to terms during her lifetime, and she left the mine property to her four nephews. In 1986, the National Park Service acquired the property from her nephew Will Sparkes.

== Personal life ==
Sparkes was a close friend of Sharlot Hall. She was also an excellent cornet player, who was able to "triple-tongue."

== Awards and legacy ==
- 1937: Elected member of the board of governors at the Western Conference of Chamber of Commerce Secretaries (first woman to receive this honor)
- 1985: Inducted into Arizona Women's Hall of Fame
- Prescott created the Grace M. Sparkes Memorial Activity Center
- 2020: A bridge in Prescott is named after Sparkes
