= Victor LaMer =

American chemist (1895–1966)

Victor K. LaMer
- Born: June 15, 1895; Leavenworth, Kansas
- Died: September 26, 1966 (aged 71); Nottingham, England
- Education: Columbia University
- Spouse: Ethel Agatha McGreevy (m. 1918)
- Children: 3
- Scientific career
- Fields: Chemistry
- Workplaces: Columbia University
- Thesis: The Effect of Temperature and Hydrogen Ion Concentration upon the Rate of Destruction of the Antiscorbutic Vitamin (1921)
- Doctoral advisor: Henry Clapp Sherman
- Doctoral students: Milton Kerker

Victor Kuhn LaMer or La Mer (June 15, 1895 – September 26, 1966) was an American chemist and academic who was a professor at Columbia University. He has been described as "the father of colloid chemistry".

== Early life and education ==
LaMer was born in Leavenworth, Kansas on June 15, 1895. He was the son of Joseph Secondule LaMer and Anna Pauline Kuhn.

He obtained his AB degree from the University of Kansas in 1915. Over the next two years, he did a number of jobs, which include a high school teacher, a student at the University of Chicago, and a research chemist at the Carnegie Institution of Washington. In 1917 he joined the Sanitary Corps of the U.S. Army and was commissioned as a 1st Lieutenant.

In 1921, he obtained his PhD from Columbia University. His doctoral thesis was The effect of temperature and hydrogen ion concentration upon the rate of destruction of the antiscorbutic vitamin. The thesis was summarized in 1921 in the Proceedings of the National Academy of Sciences, and more thoroughly in 1922 in the Journal of the American Chemical Society.

== Career ==
LaMer joined Columbia University as an instructor in physical chemistry in 1920, became a full professor in 1935, and remained there until his retirement in 1961, continuing his scientific work with the status of emeritus professor, and was a senior researcher in mineral technology at Columbia School of Mines. In 1931, LaMer took a sabbatical and went to Stanford University, to be a visiting professor during the spring quarter directing courses in physical chemistry and catalysis.

During World War II, he was a member of the National Defense Research Council, and afterwards, was a consultant to the Atomic Energy Commission. During the war, he invented an aerosol-generator fog spray machine for the Army and Navy that killed malaria bearing mosquitoes with DDT within a half mile radius.

In 1950, he was appointed by New York City Mayor O'Dwyer to be chairman of the mayor's advisory committee on scientific rainmaking. The committee conferred with the mayor and water commissioner Stephen Carney, to give advice on rain making experiments, and to analyze and interpret reports and plans for artificially induced precipitation, due to an anticipation of lower water storage in the reservoirs.

In 1953, he traveled to Copenhagen, Denmark, where he was a Fulbright professor at the University of Copenhagen. In June 1959, he went to Australia on a Fulbright lectureship, where he was lecturing in Physical Chemistry at the CSIRO Chemical Research Laboratories in Melbourne. He was invited by the CSIRO to take part in a study program on the retardation of evaporation in reservoirs.

He was the editor of Journal of Colloid Science (now Journal of Colloid and Interface Science) from its foundation in 1946 until 1965.

== Honors ==
He was elected a Fellow of the American Physical Society in 1931 and a Member of the National Academy of Sciences in 1948.

He was also a member of American Chemical Society, and an elected member of the Royal Academy of Science, Letters and Fine Arts of Belgium and the Royal Danish Academy of Sciences and Letters He was a fellow of the New York Academy of Sciences and its president in 1949.

He received an honorary degree from Clarkson University in 1962. LaMer was also an honorary professor at National University of San Marcos in Lima, Peru.

The Victor K. LaMer chair of colloid and surface science at Clarkson University is named in his memory. The Division of Colloid and Surface Chemistry of the American Chemical Society offers an annual Victor K. LaMer Award for Graduate Research in Colloid and Surface Chemistry. LaMer received the ACS Award in Colloid Chemistry in 1956.

He received the President's Certificate of Merit for his contributions to defense for his research on aerosols.

== Personal life and death ==
On July 31, 1918, LaMer married Ethel Agatha McGreevy. They had three daughters.

On September 26, 1966, he died suddenly and unexpectedly while in Nottingham, England to present a paper to a meeting of the Faraday Society.

== Select publications ==
- La Mer, V. K.; Sherman, H. C.; Campbell, H. L. (1921). "The Effect of Temperature and of the Concentration of Hydrogen Ions upon the Rate of Destruction of Antiscorbutic Vitamin (Vitamin C)". Proceedings of the National Academy of Sciences. 7 (9): 279–281. Bibcode:1921PNAS....7..279S. doi:10.1073/pnas.7.9.279. ISSN 0027-8424. PMC 1084895. PMID 16576607.
- La Mer, Victor K. (December 31, 1937). "The Energy of Activation of Protein Denaturations". Science. 86 (2244): 614–616. Bibcode:1937Sci....86..614L. doi:10.1126/science.86.2244.614. ISSN 0036-8075. PMID 17757876.
- La Mer, Victor K.; Zaiser, Ethel M. (1948). "The kinetics of the formation and growth of monodispersed sulfur hydrosols". Journal of Colloid Science. 3 (6): 571–598. doi:10.1016/s0095-8522(48)90050-6. ISSN 0095-8522. PMID 18106126.
- La Mer, Victor K. (1949). "Some Current Misconceptions of N. L. Sadi Carnot's Memoir and Cycle". Science. 109 (2841): 598. Bibcode:1949Sci...109..598L. doi:10.1126/science.109.2841.598. ISSN 0036-8075. JSTOR 1676672. PMID 17835392.
- La Mer, Victor K.; Cotson, Sydney (1953). "The Growth and Shrinkage of Aerosols". Science. 118 (3070): 516–517. Bibcode:1953Sci...118..516L. doi:10.1126/science.118.3070.516. ISSN 0036-8075. JSTOR 1680107. PMID 17758698.
- La Mer, Victor K.; Healy, Thomas W. (1964). "Specification of Materials for the Retardation of Evaporation of Water-the Spreading of Hexadecanol Monolayers". Proceedings of the National Academy of Sciences of the United States of America. 52 (3): 679–683. doi:10.1073/pnas.52.3.679. ISSN 0027-8424. JSTOR 72621. PMC 300327. PMID 16591213.
