= Henry Clapp Sherman =

American chemist (1875–1955)

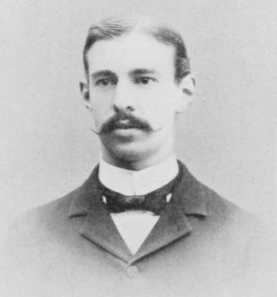
- c. 1899
- Born: October 16, 1875; Ash Grove, Virginia, US
- Died: October 7, 1955 (aged 79); East Greenbush, New York, US
- Spouse: Cora Aldrich Bowen (m. 1903)
- Awards: Franklin Medal (1947)
- Scientific career
- Fields: Chemistry
- Doctoral students: Mary Letitia Caldwell; Victor LaMer; Adelaide Spohn

Henry Clapp Sherman (October 16, 1875 – October 7, 1955) was an American food chemist and nutritionist. He was a professor of chemistry at Columbia University and the president of the American Society of Biological Chemists.

== Biography ==
Sherman was born in Ash Grove, Virginia. He received a Bachelor of Science degree from the Maryland Agricultural College in 1893, a Master of Science degree from Columbia University in 1896 and a Doctor of Philosophy degree in 1897. From 1899 until his retirement he was a faculty member in the department of chemistry at Columbia University and professor of food chemistry. He was executive officer of the department of chemistry (1919–1939) and was awarded an honorary degree of Doctor of Science in 1929.

He provided early evidence that enzymes such as amylase could consist of pure protein and pioneered quantitive studies on the physiological impact of vitamin A, B1, B2, C calcium, phosphorus, iron and protein.

He died in East Greenbush, New York on October 7, 1955.

== Personal life ==
He married Cora Aldrich Bowen on September 9, 1903. They had four children: Phoebe (deceased, 1929), Henry Alvord (chemical engineer), William Bowen (medicine, deceased, 1971), and Caroline Clapp (biochemist, Mrs. Oscar E. Lanford, Jr.).

== Honors and awards ==
- 1926 President, American Society of Biological Chemists
- 1933 National Academy of Sciences, elected member
- 1934 William H. Nichols Medal
- 1947 Franklin Medal
- 1949 Chandler Medal, Columbia University
- 1950 Borden Award, American Institute of Nutrition

== Selected publications ==
- Chemistry of Food and Nutrition (1911)
- Food Products (1914, 1948)
- Methods of Organic Analysis (1915)
- The Chemistry of Food and Nutrition (1918)
- The Vitamins (1929, with Sybil Laura Smith)
- The Science of Nutrition (1943)
- Foods: Their Values and Management (1946)
- Food and Health (1947)
- Calcium and Phosphorus in Foods and Nutrition (1947)
- The Nutritional Improvement of Life (1950)
- Essentials of Nutrition (1951)
