= Georgian Adams =

American scientist

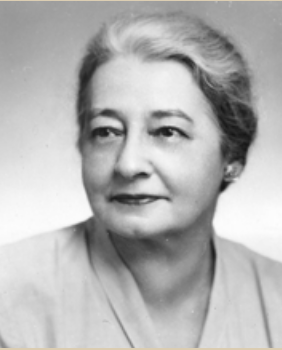
- Georgian Adams, from a USDA publication
- Born: November 26, 1897; Lead, South Dakota, U.S.
- Died: November 14, 1986 (aged 88); Orleans, Massachusetts, U.S.
- Occupations: Chemist, food scientist

Georgian Adams (November 26, 1897 – November 14, 1986) was an American scientist, a chemist interested in human nutrition. She worked at the United States Department of Agriculture (USDA) as a research chemist in the 1930s and 1940s.

== Early life and education ==
Adams was born in Lead, South Dakota, the daughter of Sylvester V. Adams and Isabelle A. Clarke Adams. She graduated from Lincoln High School in Nebraska, and earned bachelor's and master's degrees in chemistry from the University of Nebraska, in 1918 and 1919. Her master's advisor was Mary L. Fossler, and her thesis project was titled "Nitrosoresorcin dyestuffs". She completed a Ph.D. in hygiene at Johns Hopkins University in 1927, with a dissertation on the use of cod liver oil to prevent rickets.

In Nebraska she was president of the Lincoln chapter of Iota Sigma Pi, a women's chemistry society.

== Career ==
Adams taught chemistry and physics, chaired the physical sciences department, and advised the YWCA chapter at York College in Nebraska. She worked in Washington, D.C., at the United States Department of Agriculture (USDA) in the 1930s and 1940s, as a food research chemist and senior experiment station administrator. She was a member of the American Association for the Advancement of Science. She served on the advisory board of the Journal of Home Economics in the 1940s.

In 1958, she represented the USDA in reviewing experiment station work in Hawaii. The University of Nebraska presented Adams with an honorary doctorate in 1964.

== Publications ==
- "Cod Liver Oil as a Source of Vitamin A" (1925, with Louis T. Anderegg and Vivian E. Nelson)
- "Cod Liver Oil as Food" (1927, with V. E. Nelson, R. L. Jones, and L. T. Anderegg)
- "A Method for the Biological Assay of Cod Liver Oil" (1928, with E. V. McCollum)
- "Proximate composition of fresh vegetables" (1931, with Charlotte Chatfield)
- "Classification of Fruits and Vegetables According to Their Carbohydrate Content" (1935, with Charlotte Chatsfield)
- "Proximate composition of American food materials" (1940, with Charlotte Chatsfield)
- "Experiment station research on war problems in the home" (1942, with Sybil Laura Smith)
- "Experiment station research on the vitamin content and the preservation of foods" (1944, with Sybil Laura Smith)
- "RMA Home Economics Research" (1948, with Ruth O'Brien)
- "Fifty Years of Home Economics Research" (1959)

== Death ==
Adams died in Orleans, Massachusetts, in 1986, at the age of 88.
