= Sybil Laura Smith =

American home economist

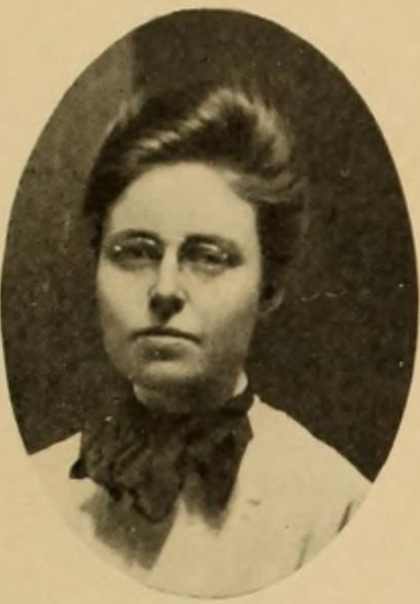
- Sybil Laura Smith, from the 1904 yearbook of Smith College
- Born: July 5, 1882; Gardner, Massachusetts, U.S.
- Died: 1963 (aged 80–81)
- Occupation: Home economist

Sybil Laura Smith (July 5, 1882 – 1963) was an American home economist at the United States Department of Agriculture (USDA).

== Early life and education ==
Smith was born in Gardner, Massachusetts, the daughter of Henry Hill Smith and Florence I. Morse Smith. She graduated from Smith College in 1904. She earned a master's degree at Columbia University in 1908.

== Career ==
Smith was a school teacher after college. She was a home economics specialist and principal experiment station administrator who worked in the USDA's Office of Experimental Stations in the 1930s and 1940s. She spoke and wrote on nutrition, including on the vitamin levels in preserved foods, during the Great Depression and World War II, and published compilations of home economics research. She also spoke on several radio programs about her work, and traveled nationally to visit USDA experiment stations. In 1951 she received an honorary doctorate from the University of Massachusetts. She encouraged the work of other women in food science, including Helen Parsons and Abby Marlatt.

== Publications ==
- The Vitamins (1922, with Henry Clapp Sherman)
- "Vitamins A, B, and C" (1926)
- Vitamins in Food Materials (1929)
- "Betterment of the Rural Home" (1934)
- "Research on nutrition of young women" (1937, radio presentation)
- "A Third Shelf of Home Economics Research" (1938)
- "Human Requirements of Vitamin C" (1938)
- "Vitamin Needs of Man: Vitamin C" (1939)
- "Research in Home Economics at the Land Grant Institutions, 1939-40" (1939, compiler)
- "Consumer and Family Problems" (1939)
- "Experiment station research on war problems in the home" (1942, with Georgian Adams)
- Experiment Station Research on the Vitamin Content and the Preservation of Foods (1944, with Georgian Adams)

== Personal life ==
Smith lived in Washington, D.C. with her partner, chemistry teacher Elizabeth I. Gatch, at least from 1920 to 1950. Gatch died in 1957, and Smith died in 1962, in her early eighties.
