= Milton Kerker =

American chemist

- Born: September 25, 1920; Utica, New York, U.S.
- Died: May 2, 2016 (aged 95); Thousand Oaks, California, U.S.
- Education: Columbia University
- Known for: Light scattering; Surface-enhanced Raman spectroscopy; Kerker effect
- Spouse: Reva Kerker (1946-2016; his death)
- Scientific career
- Fields: Physical chemistry; Interface and colloid science
- Workplaces: Clarkson University
- Thesis: Particle size distribution in sulfur hydrosols by polarimetric analysis of scattered light (1949)
- Academic advisors: Victor LaMer

Milton Kerker (September 25, 1920 — May 2, 2016) was an American physical chemist and former professor at department of chemistry at Clarkson University. He is best known for his work on aerosol, interface and colloid science, as well as for pioneering surface-enhanced Raman spectroscopy. Kerker effect in optics is named after him.

== Biography ==
Kerker was born on September 25, 1920, in Utica, New York. He received his A.B. in chemistry from Columbia University in 1941. From 1942 to 1945, he was a member of United States Army and received Bronze Star Medal for his service. He married his wife, Reva Stemerman, in 1946. Graduating from Columbia University with a PhD in chemistry in 1949, he joined Clarkson University as a professor in the same year. He acted as the chair of the department of chemistry from 1960 to 1964, as well as the dean of science from 1964 to 1966 and from 1981 to 1985. He retired from Clarkson University in 1991. Serving as the editor of Journal of Colloid and Interface Science from 1965 to 1992, he was also granted fellowships by Optical Society, American Chemical Society and Ford Foundation. Kerker died on May 2, 2016, in Thousand Oaks, California, U.S., and was survived by his wife and four children. He was a contributor to Midstream magazine and Jewish Theological Seminary of America, as well as Isis journal.

Kerker's work encompassed aerosol and colloid science, as well as their relation to light scattering by small particles. He is known for authoring the 1969 textbook on the subject, The Scattering of Light and Other Electromagnetic Radiation. Regarded as a pioneer of surface-enhanced Raman spectroscopy (SERS), he has worked on the mathematical models in the field. In 1986, Kerker also coauthored the article on light scattering by hypothetical magnetic spheres, which hypothesized a distinct absence of backscattering for small particles with equal relative permittivities and permeabilities. While being largely unnoticed at the time of its publication, the work has since attracted attention with the advent of metamaterials and nanophotonics; the associated phenomenon, named as Kerker effect, was later verified experimentally.

== Selected publications ==
Books

- Kerker, Milton (1969). The Scattering of Light and Other Electromagnetic Radiation. Elsevier. ISBN 978-0-12-404550-7.

Journal articles

- Aden, Arthur L.; Kerker, Milton (1951). "Scattering of electromagnetic waves from two concentric spheres". Journal of Applied Physics. 22 (10): 1242–1246. Bibcode:1951JAP....22.1242A. doi:10.1063/1.1699834.
- Kerker, Milton (1975). "Invisible bodies". Journal of the Optical Society of America. 65 (4): 376–379. doi:10.1364/JOSA.65.000376.
- Chew, H.; McNulty, P. J.; Kerker, M. (1976). "Model for Raman and fluorescent scattering by molecules embedded in small particles". Physical Review A. 13 (1): 396. Bibcode:1976PhRvA..13..396C. doi:10.1103/PhysRevA.13.396.
- Kerker, M.; Wang, D.-S.; Chew, H. (1980). "Surface enhanced Raman scattering (SERS) by molecules adsorbed at spherical particles". Applied Optics. 19 (19): 3373–3388. Bibcode:1980ApOpt..19.3373K. doi:10.1364/AO.19.003373. PMID 20234623.
- Wang, D.-S.; Kerker, M. (1981). "Enhanced Raman scattering by molecules adsorbed at the surface of colloidal spheroids". Physical Review B. 24 (4): 1777. Bibcode:1981PhRvB..24.1777W. doi:10.1103/PhysRevB.24.1777.
- Kerker, M.; Wang, D.-S.; Giles, C. L. (1983). "Electromagnetic scattering by magnetic spheres". Journal of the Optical Society of America. 73 (6): 765–767. Bibcode:1983JOSA...73..765K. doi:10.1364/JOSA.73.000765.

== See also ==
- List of textbooks in electromagnetism
