= Marie Maynard Daly =

American biochemist

- Born: April 16, 1921; Corona, Queens, New York City, U.S.
- Died: October 28, 2003 (aged 82); New York City, U.S.
- Other name: Marie Maynard Daly Clark
- Education: Queens College; New York University; Columbia University
- Known for: histones, protein synthesis, cholesterol, hypertension
- Spouse: Vincent Clark
- Scientific career
- Fields: Biochemistry
- Workplaces: Howard University; Rockefeller Institute; Columbia University's College of Physicians and Surgeons; Albert Einstein College of Medicine
- Thesis: A Study of the Products Formed by the Action of Pancreatic Amylase on Corn Starch (1947)
- Doctoral advisor: Mary Letitia Caldwell

Marie Maynard Daly (April 16, 1921 – October 28, 2003) was an American biochemist. She was the first African-American to receive a Ph.D. from Columbia University and the first African-American woman in the United States to earn a Ph.D. in chemistry. Daly made important contributions in four areas of research: the chemistry of histones, protein synthesis, the relationships between cholesterol and hypertension, and creatine's uptake by muscle cells.

== Education ==
Daly attended Hunter College High School, a laboratory high school for girls run by Hunter College faculty, where she was also encouraged to pursue chemistry. She then enrolled in Queens College, a small, fairly new school in Flushing, New York. She lived at home to save money and graduated magna cum laude from Queens College with her bachelor's degree in chemistry in 1942. Upon graduation, she was named a Queens College Scholar, an honor that is awarded to the top 2.5% of the graduating class.

Labor shortages and the need for scientists to support the war effort enabled Daly to garner fellowships to study at New York University and Columbia University for her master's and Ph.D. degrees, respectively.

Daly worked as a laboratory assistant at Queens College while studying at New York University for her master's degree in chemistry, which she completed in 1943. She became a chemistry tutor at Queens College and enrolled in the doctoral program at Columbia University, where she was supervised by Mary Letitia Caldwell, for a Ph.D. thesis titled, "A Study of the Products Formed By the Action of Pancreatic Amylase on Corn Starch" and received her Ph.D. in chemistry in 1947.

== Career ==
Daly worked as a physical science instructor at Howard University, from 1947 to 1948 while simultaneously conducting research under the direction of Herman Branson. After being awarded an American Cancer Society grant to support her postdoctoral research, she joined Alfred E. Mirsky's group at the Rockefeller Institute, which studied the cell nucleus and its constituents. This was the start of a seven-year research program at the Rockefeller Institute of Medicine, where Daly examined how proteins are constructed in the body. At the time, the structure and function of DNA were not yet understood.

Daly began working in the College of Physicians and Surgeons at Columbia University in 1955. In collaboration with Quentin B. Deming, she studied arterial metabolism. She continued this work as an assistant professor of biochemistry and of medicine at the Albert Einstein College of Medicine at Yeshiva University, where she and Deming moved in 1960. From 1958 to 1963, she also served as an investigator for the American Heart Association.

During her final years at Albert Einstein College, per Daly's efforts to increase minority enrollment in professional and graduate schools, she helped run the Martin Luther King -Robert F. Kennedy program to help prepare black students for admission. In 1971 she was promoted to associate professor.

In 1975, Daly was one of 30 minority women scientists to attend a conference examining the challenges facing minority women in STEM fields. The conference was held by the American Association for the Advancement of Science. This resulted in the publication of the report, The Double Bind: The Price of Being a Minority Woman in Science (1976) which made recommendations for recruiting and retaining minority women scientists.

Daly was a member of the board of governors of the New York Academy of Sciences for two years. She was a fellow of the American Association for the Advancement of Science and of the American Cancer Society. Daly was designated as a career scientist by the Health Research Council of the City of New York.

Daly retired in 1986 from the Albert Einstein College of Medicine, and in 1988 established a scholarship for African American chemistry and physics majors at Queens College in memory of her father. In 1999, she was recognized by the National Technical Association as one of the top 50 women in Science, Engineering and Technology.

== Research ==
=== Histones ===
Daly was particularly interested in nuclear proteins. She developed methods for the fractionation of nuclear material and the determination of its composition. It was essential to separate cellular material into all of its components, without destroying or losing any of them.

She studied histones, proteins found in cell nuclei, and was able to show the amino acid composition of various histone fractions. Her studies of histones with Mirsky provided evidence for lysine-rich histones, in contrast to the arginine-rich histones described by Albrecht Kossel. Histones have since been shown to be important in gene expression. Daly's work on histones is now considered fundamental.

=== Proteins and nucleic acids ===
Daly developed methods for separating out the nuclei of tissues and measuring the base composition of purines and pyrimidines in desoxypentose nucleic acids. She concluded, among other things, that "no bases other than adenine, guanine, thymine, and cytosine were present in appreciable amounts."

She investigated protein synthesis, including the role of cytoplasmic ribonucleoprotein in protein synthesis. Using radiolabeled amino acid glycine, she was able to measure how protein metabolism changed under feeding and fasting conditions in mice. This allowed her to monitor the activity of the cytoplasm as the radiolabeled glycine was taken up into the cell nucleus.

In 1953, Watson and Crick described the structure of DNA. Accepting the Nobel Prize for this work in 1962, Watson cited one of Daly's papers on "The role of ribonucleoprotein in protein synthesis" as contributing to his work. After 1953, the cell nucleus research field was flooded with funding opportunities.

=== Cholesterol and hypertension ===
Daly and her colleagues did some of the earliest work relating diet to the health of the cardiac and circulatory systems. They investigated the impact of cholesterol, sugar, and other nutrients. She was the first to establish that hypertension was a precursor to atherosclerosis, and the first to identify a relationship between cholesterol and clogged arteries, an important discovery in understanding how heart attacks occur.

She was especially interested in how hypertension affects the circulatory system. She showed that high cholesterol intake in diet led to clogged arteries, and that hypertension accelerated this effect. She studied the effects of diet on hypertension, and found that both cholesterol and sugar were related to hypertension. Investigating aging, she suggested that smooth muscle hypertrophy due to aging might have a causative role in hypertension and atherosclerosis. Daly was also an early investigator into the effects of cigarette smoke on the lungs and on hypertension.

=== Creatine ===
In the 1970s, Daly began studying the uptake of creatine by muscle cells, an important research topic in the energy recycling systems of muscle. Her "Uptake of Creatine by Cultured Cells" (1980) described the conditions under which muscle tissues best absorbed creatine.

== Early life ==
There is limited information about her personal life and motivation for science. Daly's father, Ivan C. Daly, had immigrated from the British West Indies, found work as a postal clerk and eventually married Helen Page of Washington, D.C. They lived in New York City, and Daly was born and raised in Corona, Queens. She often visited her maternal grandparents in Washington, where she read about scientists and their achievements in her grandfather's extensive library. She was especially impressed by Paul de Kruif's The Microbe Hunters, a work which influenced her decision to become a scientist.

Daly's interest in science was also influenced by her father, who had attended Cornell University with the intention of becoming a chemist, but had been unable to complete his education due to a lack of funds. Daly would thus complete her father's ambition by majoring in chemistry. Years later, she started a Queens College scholarship fund in his honor to assist minority students majoring in chemistry and or physics.

Daly married and took the name Marie Maynard Daly Clark. Her husband died before her and they did have 2 children. She died on October 28, 2003.

== Legacy ==
On February 26, 2016, the founding principal of the new elementary school P.S.360Q, Mr. R. Emmanuel-Cooke, announced that the school would be named "The Dr. Marie M. Daly Academy of Excellence" in honor of the Queens resident. Additionally Einstein College also created an annual memorial lecture called The Marie M. Daly Memorial Celebration that is sponsored by the division of Biomedical Sciences and the Einstein Minority Scientist Association. Every year guest speakers are invited to give a lecture highlighting diversity and contribution of minorities to science.

== Selected bibliography ==
- Daly, Marie M.; Mirsky, A.E. (June 1949). "Chromatography of Purines and Pyrimidines on Starch Columns". Journal of Biological Chemistry. 179 (2): 981–982. doi:10.1016/S0021-9258(19)51291-1. PMID 18150028.
- Daly, M.M.; Allfrey, V.G.; Mirsky, A.E. (May 20, 1950). "Purine and Pyrimidine Contents of Some Desoxypentose Nucleic Acids" (PDF). Journal of General Physiology. 33 (5): 497–510. doi:10.1085/jgp.33.5.497. PMC 2147206. PMID 15422104.
- Daly, Marie; Mirsky, A.E.; Ris, Hans (March 20, 1951). "The Amino Acid Composition and Some Properties of Histones" (PDF). The Journal of General Physiology. 34 (4): 439–450. doi:10.1085/jgp.34.4.439. PMC 2147226. PMID 14824510.
- Daly, Marie M.; Mirsky, A.E. (November 1952). "Formation of Protein in the Pancreas". Journal of General Physiology. 36 (2): 243–254. doi:10.1085/jgp.36.2.243. PMC 2147369. PMID 13011280.
- Daly, Marie M.; Allfrey, V.G.; Mirsky, A.E. (November 1952). "Uptake of Glycine-N^{15} by Components of Cell Nuclei" (PDF). Journal of General Physiology. 36 (2): 173–179. doi:10.1085/jgp.36.2.173. PMC 2147362. PMID 13011275.
- Allfrey, V.; Daly, M.M.; Mirsky, A.E. (November 20, 1953). "Synthesis of protein in the pancreas. II. The role of ribonucleoprotein in protein synthesis". Journal of General Physiology. 37 (2): 157–175. doi:10.1085/jgp.37.2.157. PMC 214743. PMID 13109153.
- Mirsky, A.E.; Allfrey, V.G.; Daly, M.M. (September 1954). "The Uptake of N^{15}-Labelled Glycine by Liver Proteins". Journal of Histochemistry and Cytochemistry. 2 (5): 376–377. doi:10.1177/2.5.376. PMID 13192326. S2CID 40223958.
- Daly, M.M.; Mirsky, A.E. (January 1955). "Histones With High Lysine Content". Journal of General Physiology. 38 (3): 405–413. doi:10.1085/jgp.38.3.405. PMC 2147486. PMID 13221780.
- Allfrey, V.G.; Daly, M.M.; Mirsky, A.E. (January 20, 1955). "Some Observations on Protein Metabolism in Chromosomes of Non-Dividing Cells" (PDF). Journal of General Physiology. 38 (3): 415–424. doi:10.1085/jgp.38.3.415. PMC 2147482. PMID 13221781.
- Daly, M.M.; Allfrey, V.G.; Mirsky, A.E. (November 20, 1955). "Synthesis of Protein in the Pancreas. III. Uptake of Glycine-N^{15} by the Trypsinogen and Chymotrypsinogen of Mouse Pancreas" (PDF). Journal of General Physiology. 39 (2): 207–210. doi:10.1085/jgp.39.2.207. PMC 2147525. PMID 13271721.
- Deming, Q.B.; Mosbach, E.H.; Bevans, M.; Daly, M.M.; Abell, L.L.; Martin, E.; Brun, L.M.; Halpern, E.; Kaplan, R. (April 1, 1958). "Blood Pressure, Cholesterol Content of Serum and Tissues and Atherogenesis in the Rat" (PDF). The Journal of Experimental Medicine. 107 (4): 581–598. doi:10.1084/jem.107.4.581. PMC 2136835. PMID 13513919.
- Daly, Marie M.; Gupride, E. Gambetta (February 1, 1959). "The Respiration and Cytochrome Oxidase Activity of Rat Aorta in Experimental Hypertension" (PDF). Journal of Experimental Medicine. 109 (2): 187–195. doi:10.1084/jem.109.2.187. PMC 2136939. PMID 13620848.
- Adel, Harold; Daly, Marie M.; Deming, Quentin B.; Brun, Lili; Raeff, Victoria (1962). "Effect of Hypertension on Cholesterol Synthesis in Rats" (PDF). Journal of Clinical Investigation (Papers Presented / Proceedings of the Fifty-Fourth Annual Meeting of the American Society for Clinical Investigation, April 30, 1962. 41 (6): 1340.
- Daly, M.M.; Deming, Q.B.; Raeff, V.M.; Brun, L.M. (October 1963). "Cholesterol Concentration and Cholesterol Synthesis in Aortas of Rats With Renal Hypertension" (PDF). Journal of Clinical Investigation. 42 (10): 1606–1612. doi:10.1172/JCI104845. PMC 289439. PMID 14074354.
- Adel, H.N.; Deming, Q.B.; Daly, M.M.; Raeff, V.M.; Brun, L.M. (October 1965). "The Effect of Experimental Hypertension on Cholesterol Synthesis in the Rat". Journal of Clinical and Laboratory Medicine. 66 (4): 571–581. PMID 5843085.
- Wolinsky, Harvey; Daly, Marie M. (November 1970). "A Method for the Isolation of Intima-Media Samples from Arteries". Proceedings of the Society for Experimental Biology and Medicine. 135 (2): 364–368. doi:10.3181/00379727-135-35052. PMID 4921030. S2CID 46610507.
- Daly, M.M. (May 1971). "Biosynthesis of squalene and sterols by rat aorta". Journal of Lipid Research. 12 (3): 367–375. doi:10.1016/S0022-2275(20)39518-3. PMID 5579265.
- Daly, Marie M. (September 1972). "Effects of Hypertension on the Lipid Composition of Rat Aortic Intima-Media". Circulation Research. 31 (3): 410–416. doi:10.1161/01.res.31.3.410. PMID 5057020. S2CID 12008214.
- Wolinsky, Harvey; Goldfischer, Sidney; Daly, Marie M.; Kasak, Lisa E.; Coltoff-Schiller, Bernice (April 1975). "Arterial Lysosomes and Connective Tissue in Primate Atherosclerosis and Hypertension". Circulation Research. 36 (4): 553–561. doi:10.1161/01.res.36.4.553. PMID 1116247.
- Daly, M.M. (January 1976). "Effects of age and hypertension on utilization of glucose by rat aorta". American Journal of Physiology. 230 (1): 30–33. doi:10.1152/ajplegacy.1976.230.1.30. PMID 1251907.
- Park, Sung Suh; Kikkawa, Yutaka; Goldring, Irene P.; Daly, Marie M.; Zelefsky, Melvin; Shim, Chang; Spierer, Morris; Morita, Toyohiko (June 1, 1977). "An Animal Model of Cigarette Smoking in Beagle Dogs Correlative Evaluation of Effects on Pulmonary Function, Defense, and Morphology". American Review of Respiratory Disease. 115 (6): 971–979. doi:10.1164/arrd.1977.115.6.971 (inactive 12 July 2025). PMID 262108.
- Daly, Marie M.; Seifter, Sam (August 1980). "Uptake of creatine by cultured cells". Archives of Biochemistry and Biophysics. 203 (1): 317–324. doi:10.1016/0003-9861(80)90182-4. PMID 7406503.
- Daly, Marie M. (February 1, 1985). "Guanidinoacetate methyltransferase activity in tissues and cultured cells". Archives of Biochemistry and Biophysics. 236 (2): 576–584. doi:10.1016/0003-9861(85)90661-7. PMID 3970526.

== See also ==
- Timeline of women in science
