= Thomas D. Edwards =

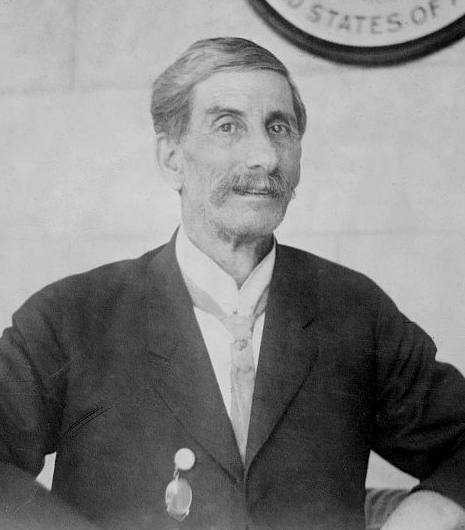

Thomas D. Edwards (1847–1935) was the U.S. Consul at Ciudad Juarez, Mexico, 1905–17 and Cornwall, Ontario, 1919–22.

== Biography ==
Edwards was born on April 30, 1847, in Floyd, New York to John and Mary Evans, immigrants from Wales. In 1877 he traveled to Lead, South Dakota for the Black Hills gold rush. He was appointed postmaster of Lead by Chester Arthur. He was the editor of Lead City Daily Tribune. In 1899–1900 he married Lucy Mary Seymour (1866–1923). In 1905 he was appointed by Theodore Roosevelt as consul at Ciudad Juárez and served to 1917. In 1919–22, he was U.S. Consul in Cornwall, Ontario. Edwards died in Lead, South Dakota, on August 3, 1935.
