= Lead, South Dakota =

- City
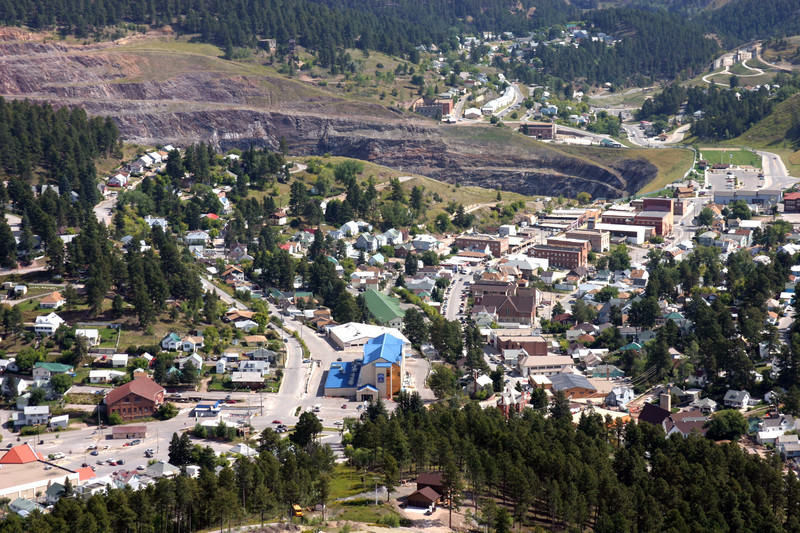
- Aerial photo of Lead in 2004

- Location in Lawrence County and the state of South Dakota
- Coordinates: 44°21′10″N 103°46′02″W
- Country: United States
- State: South Dakota
- County: Lawrence
- Incorporated: 1890

Area
  - Total: 2.06 sq mi (5.33 km^{2})
  - Land: 2.06 sq mi (5.33 km^{2})
  - Water: 0 sq mi (0.00 km^{2})
- Elevation: 5,296 ft (1,614 m)

Population (2020)
  - Total: 2,982
  - Density: 1,448.7/sq mi (559.35/km^{2})
- Time zone: UTC−7 (Mountain (MST))
  - Summer (DST): UTC−6 (MDT)
- ZIP code: 57754
- Area code: 605
- FIPS code: 46-36220
- GNIS feature ID: 1267455
- Website: cityoflead.com
- Lead Historic District
- U.S. National Register of Historic Places
- U.S. Historic district
- Architectural style: Greek Revival, Hip cottage
- NRHP reference No.: 74001892
- Added to NRHP: December 31, 1974

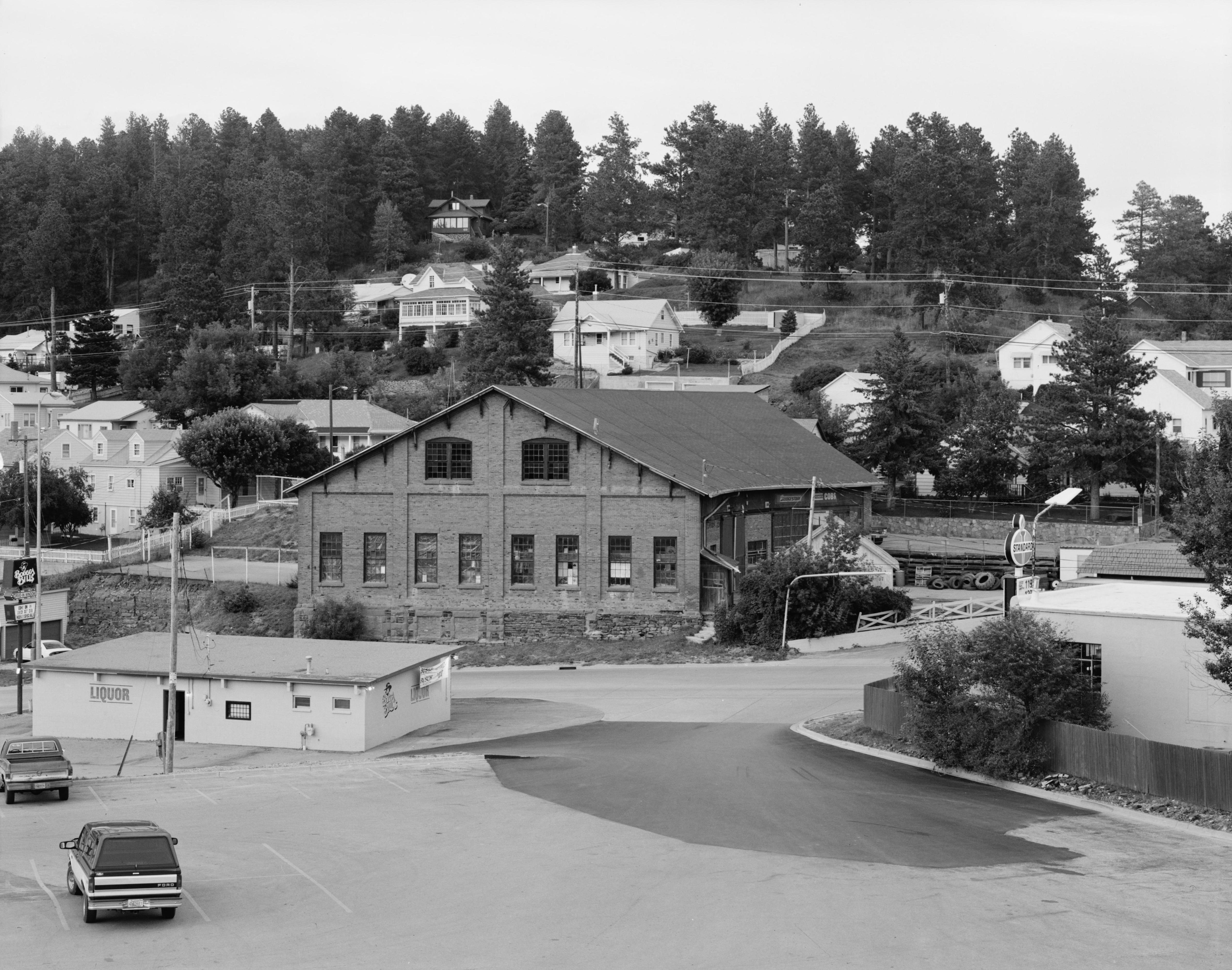
Buildings on Lead's western side

Lead (/ˈliːd/ LEED) is a city in Lawrence County, South Dakota, United States. The population was 2,982 at the 2020 census. Lead is located in western South Dakota, in the Black Hills near the Wyoming state line.

== History ==
The city was officially founded on July 10, 1876, after the discovery of gold. The city was named for the leads or lodes of the deposits of valuable ores. It is the site of the Homestake Mine, the largest, deepest (8,240 feet [2,510 m]) and most productive gold mine in the Western Hemisphere before closing in January 2002. By 1910, Lead had a population of 8,382, making it the second-largest town in South Dakota.

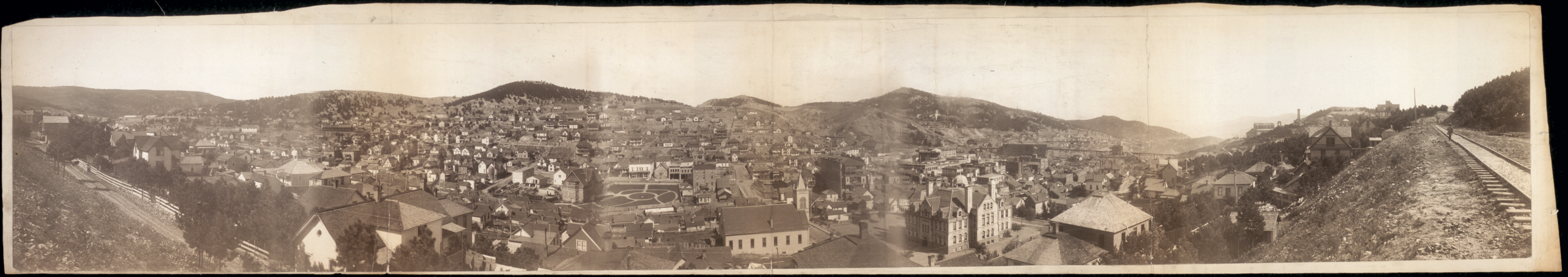
Panorama of Lead, South Dakota, c. 1901
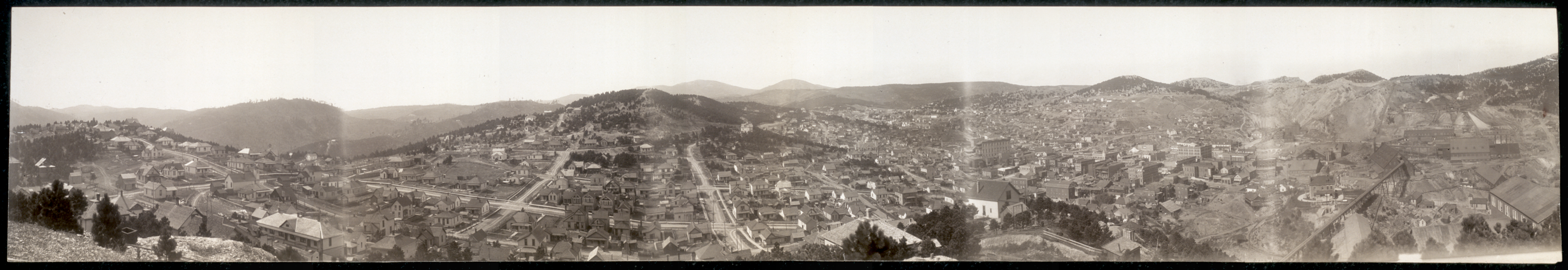
Second panorama of Lead, South Dakota, c. 1901

Lead was founded as a company town by the Homestake Mining Company, which ran the nearby Homestake Mine. Phoebe Hearst, wife of George Hearst, one of the principals, was instrumental in making Lead more livable. She established the Hearst Free Public Library in town, and in 1900 the Hearst Free Kindergarten. Phoebe Hearst and Thomas Grier, the Homestake Mine superintendent, worked together to create the Homestake Opera House and Recreation Center for the benefit of miner workers and their families. Phoebe Hearst donated regularly to Lead's churches, and provided college scholarships from Lead–Deadwood school, with a staff of over 130, to the children of mine and mill workers.

In the early 1930s, due to fear of cave-ins of the miles of tunnels under Lead's Homestake Mine, many of the town's buildings located in the bottom of a canyon were moved further uphill to safer locations.

Lead and the Homestake Mine are the site of the Sanford Underground Research Facility, or Sanford Lab, a DOE facility for low-background experiments on neutrinos, dark matter, and other nuclear physics topics, as well as biology and mine engineering studies.

In 1974, most of Lead was added to the National Register of Historic Places under the name of the "Lead Historic District". Over four hundred buildings and 580 acres (230 ha) were included in the historic district, which has boundaries roughly equivalent to the city limits.

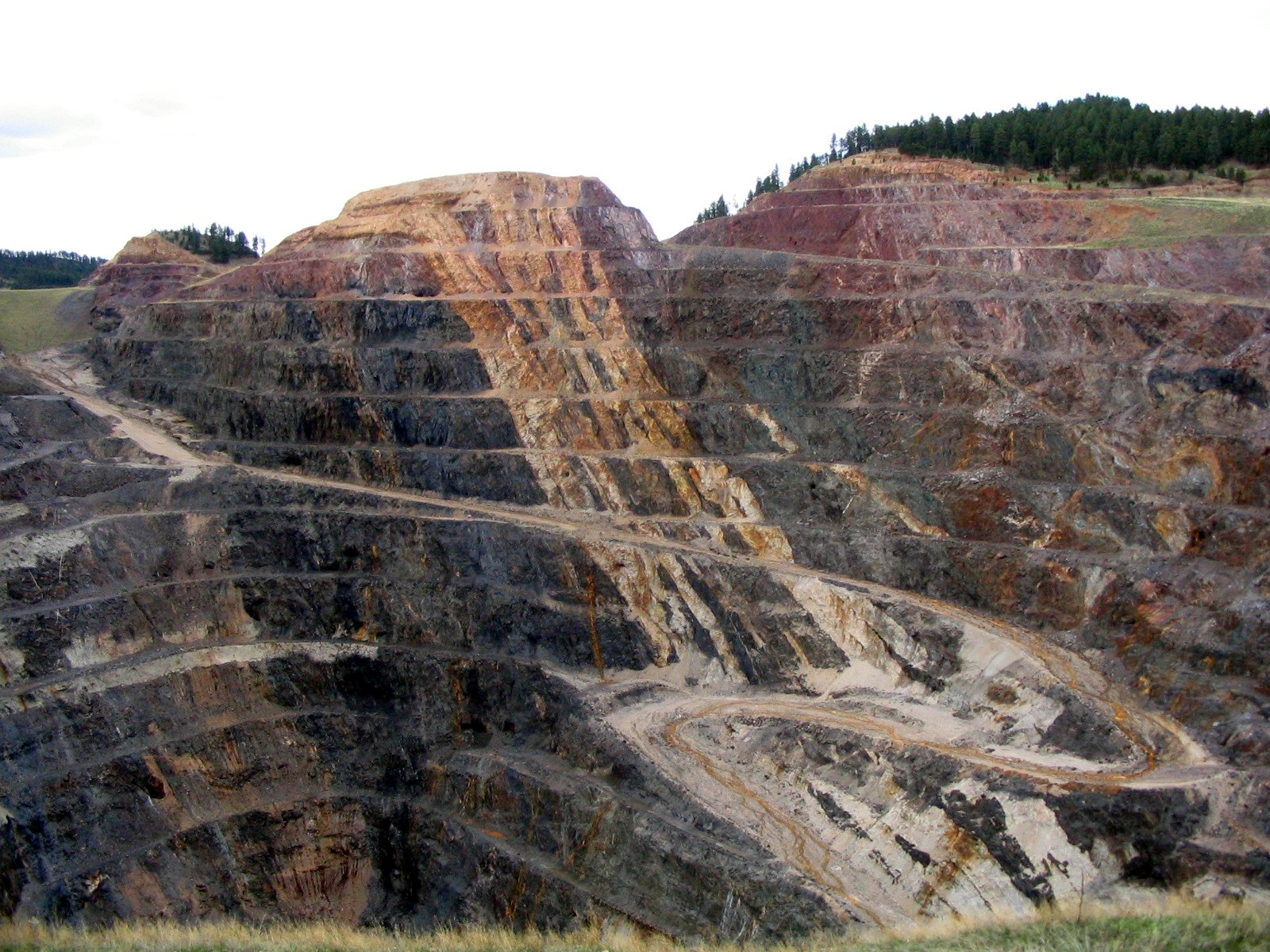
The Homestake Mine pit in Lead

== Geography ==
According to the United States Census Bureau, the city has a total area of 2.06 square miles (5.34 km^{2}), all land.

Two prominent manmade features of Lead's geography are the giant open cut, which was used for surface gold mining by the Homestake Mine, and the resulting ridge nearby built with the non-producing material from the cut.

=== Climate ===
Lead has a humid continental climate (Köppen Dfb) with warm summers and cold, very snowy winters with the typical extremely variable temperatures of the western Great Plains.

Its high elevation in the Black Hills makes Lead one of the wettest places in South Dakota and among the snowiest places in the contiguous United States with a mean snowfall of 183.9 inches or 4.7 meters. During the cold and snowy winter of 1993–94, a whopping 364.7 inches (9.3 m) of snow fell and three years later snowfall totalled 324.0 inches (8.2 m). However, frequent chinook winds mean that most of the enormous snowfall melts during the winter: the highest snow cover on record is 73 inches (1.9 m) on March 1, 1998 – during a storm that totalled 114.6 inches or 2.9 meters of snow (water equivalent 4.12 inches or 104.6 millimeters) over six days ending March 2. Mean snow depth in January is only 7 inches or 0.18 meters and the median even less at 5 inches or 0.13 meters. 12.9 mornings can be expected to fall to or below 0 °F (−17.8 °C), with the average window for zero temperatures being December 7 to March 3; on the other hand during winter 12.8 afternoons can be expected to get to or above 50 °F or 10 °C. The coldest temperature has been −40 °F or −40 °C on February 8, 1936.

During the spring, weather becomes very changeable with frequent severe storms: the first maximum of at least 70 °F or 21.1 °C can be expected on April 17, but the last spring freeze normally does not occur until May 24. The spring is also the wettest season owing to the frequent storms, with the wettest month of May 1965 seeing 14.84 inches (376.9 mm) of precipitation. The wettest year – and a South Dakota calendar year record – has been 2013 with 49.52 inches (1,257.8 mm) and the driest 1936 with 12.84 inches (326.1 mm). Summers are very warm in the afternoon, but mornings are pleasantly cool: frost-level temperatures occurred in July 1921 and in the Augusts of 1910 and 1911, with August 1910 seeing a freak snowstorm of 1.5 inches or 0.038 meters. The hottest temperature has been 101 °F (38.3 °C) on July 7, 1936, during a notorious Plains heat wave. Precipitation is lower in summer than in spring, and declines further into the fall and winter as temperatures cool. Fall weather is similarly variable in temperature, as is the spring; however, the fall period tends to be less prone to severe weather.

Climate data for Lead, South Dakota (1991–2020 normals, extremes 1909–present)
Month	Jan	Feb	Mar	Apr	May	Jun	Jul	Aug	Sep	Oct	Nov	Dec	Year
Record high °F (°C)	69 (21)	69 (21)	79 (26)	84 (29)	89 (32)	98 (37)	101 (38)	98 (37)	96 (36)	87 (31)	76 (24)	67 (19)	101 (38)
Mean maximum °F (°C)	56.9 (13.8)	57.6 (14.2)	65.4 (18.6)	72.5 (22.5)	80.2 (26.8)	88.1 (31.2)	91.9 (33.3)	91.0 (32.8)	87.5 (30.8)	77.7 (25.4)	64.3 (17.9)	55.7 (13.2)	93.2 (34.0)
Mean daily maximum °F (°C)	38.3 (3.5)	38.8 (3.8)	47.1 (8.4)	53.8 (12.1)	63.2 (17.3)	74.2 (23.4)	81.7 (27.6)	80.9 (27.2)	72.2 (22.3)	57.4 (14.1)	46.0 (7.8)	38.1 (3.4)	57.6 (14.2)
Daily mean °F (°C)	28.0 (−2.2)	28.2 (−2.1)	35.9 (2.2)	42.5 (5.8)	51.9 (11.1)	62.1 (16.7)	69.2 (20.7)	68.0 (20.0)	59.6 (15.3)	46.3 (7.9)	35.7 (2.1)	28.3 (−2.1)	46.3 (7.9)
Mean daily minimum °F (°C)	17.7 (−7.9)	17.6 (−8.0)	24.6 (−4.1)	31.3 (−0.4)	40.6 (4.8)	50.0 (10.0)	56.7 (13.7)	55.2 (12.9)	47.0 (8.3)	35.2 (1.8)	25.4 (−3.7)	18.5 (−7.5)	35.0 (1.7)
Mean minimum °F (°C)	−8.1 (−22.3)	−6.4 (−21.3)	1.4 (−17.0)	12.9 (−10.6)	25.7 (−3.5)	37.2 (2.9)	44.9 (7.2)	42.3 (5.7)	30.6 (−0.8)	15.1 (−9.4)	3.5 (−15.8)	−5.4 (−20.8)	−14.9 (−26.1)
Record low °F (°C)	−37 (−38)	−40 (−40)	−20 (−29)	−5 (−21)	8 (−13)	24 (−4)	31 (−1)	30 (−1)	12 (−11)	−12 (−24)	−19 (−28)	−33 (−36)	−40 (−40)
Average precipitation inches (mm)	1.54 (39)	1.83 (46)	2.24 (57)	3.54 (90)	4.90 (124)	3.81 (97)	3.12 (79)	2.32 (59)	1.96 (50)	3.32 (84)	1.70 (43)	1.51 (38)	31.79 (807)
Average snowfall inches (cm)	24.8 (63)	26.2 (67)	27.6 (70)	29.0 (74)	6.7 (17)	0.9 (2.3)	0.0 (0.0)	0.0 (0.0)	1.8 (4.6)	19.3 (49)	22.3 (57)	25.3 (64)	183.9 (467)
Average precipitation days (≥ 0.01 in)	10.6	11.2	11.2	12.9	14.1	13.3	12.0	9.2	8.4	10.5	9.6	10.0	133.0
Average snowy days (≥ 0.1 in)	10.4	10.4	9.1	7.5	2.0	0.2	0.0	0.0	0.6	4.8	7.9	9.2	62.1
Source: NOAA

== Demographics ==
Historical population
Census	Pop.	Note	%±
1880	1,487		—
1890	2,581		73.6%
1900	6,210		140.6%
1910	8,392		35.1%
1920	5,013		−40.3%
1930	5,733		14.4%
1940	7,520		31.2%
1950	6,422		−14.6%
1960	6,211		−3.3%
1970	5,420		−12.7%
1980	4,330		−20.1%
1990	3,632		−16.1%
2000	3,027		−16.7%
2010	3,124		3.2%
2020	2,982		−4.5%
U.S. Decennial Census; 2015 Estimate

=== 2020 census ===
As of the 2020 census, Lead had a population of 2,982. The median age was 42.1 years. 22.8% of residents were under the age of 18 and 17.8% of residents were 65 years of age or older. For every 100 females there were 99.7 males, and for every 100 females age 18 and over there were 98.0 males age 18 and over. As of the 2020 census, 99.6% of residents lived in urban areas, while 0.4% lived in rural areas. As of the 2020 census, there were 1,403 households in Lead, of which 25.6% had children under the age of 18 living in them. Of all households, 36.2% were married-couple households, 25.2% were households with a male householder and no spouse or partner present, and 29.9% were households with a female householder and no spouse or partner present. About 37.9% of all households were made up of individuals and 15.0% had someone living alone who was 65 years of age or older. As of the 2020 census, there were 1,727 housing units, of which 18.8% were vacant. The homeowner vacancy rate was 1.6% and the rental vacancy rate was 10.1%.

Racial composition as of the 2020 census
Race	Number	Percent
White	2,642	88.6%
Black or African American	11	0.4%
American Indian and Alaska Native	73	2.4%
Asian	19	0.6%
Native Hawaiian and Other Pacific Islander	6	0.2%
Some other race	34	1.1%
Two or more races	197	6.6%
Hispanic or Latino (of any race)	143	4.8%

=== 2010 census ===
At the 2010 census there were 3,124 people in 1,420 households, including 828 families, in the city. The population density was 1,516.5 inhabitants per square mile (585.5/km^{2}). There were 1,694 housing units at an average density of 822.3 per square mile (317.5/km^{2}). The racial makeup of the city was 94.6% White, 0.3% African American, 2.0% Native American, 0.4% Asian, 0.4% from other races, and 2.3% from two or more races. Hispanic or Latino people of any race were 2.9%.

Of the 1,420 households, 27.6% had children under the age of 18 living with them, 40.6% were married couples living together, 13.0% had a female householder with no husband present, 4.7% had a male householder with no wife present, and 41.7% were non-families. 35.1% of households were one person and 10.8% were one person aged 65 or older. The average household size was 2.19 and the average family size was 2.82.

The median age was 40.5 years. 23.1% of residents were under the age of 18; 7.4% were between the ages of 18 and 24; 25.3% were from 25 to 44; 31.5% were from 45 to 64; and 12.7% were 65 or older. The gender makeup of the city was 50.3% male and 49.7% female.

=== 2000 census ===
At the 2000 census there were 3,027 people in 1,279 households, including 832 families, in the city. The population density was 1,521.5 inhabitants per square mile (587.5/km^{2}). There were 1,617 housing units at an average density of 812.8 per square mile (313.8/km^{2}). The racial makeup of the city was 95.74% White, 0.23% African American, 2.25% Native American, 0.20% Asian, 0.59% from other races, and 0.99% from two or more races. Hispanic or Latino people of any race were 2.71%. 36.5% were of German, 8.1% English, 7.8% Irish, 7.1% Norwegian and 6.7% American ancestry according to Census 2000.

Of the 1,279 households, 33.2% had children under the age of 18 living with them, 47.8% were married couples living together, 12.4% had a female householder with no husband present, and 34.9% were non-families. 29.2% of households were one person and 11.8% were one person aged 65 or older. The average household size was 2.35 and the average family size was 2.89.

The age distribution was 26.1% under the age of 18, 8.5% from 18 to 24, 30.2% from 25 to 44, 22.2% from 45 to 64, and 13.0% 65 or older. The median age was 37 years. For every 100 females, there were 100.9 males. For every 100 females age 18 and over, there were 96.8 males.

As of 2000 the median income for a household in the city was $29,485, and the median family income was $35,855. Males had a median income of $25,958 versus $18,841 for females. The per capita income for the city was $15,726. About 10.7% of families and 12.9% of the population were below the poverty line, including 15.7% of those under age 18 and 12.9% of those age 65 or over.

== Recreation ==
Lead is home to many hiking trails such as the Homestake trail which runs from Lead to Deadwood. The towns are 3 miles apart where the trails runs through. The trail head in Deadwood rests on the Mickelson trail close to where it starts. The trail head in Lead rests beside the city of Lead dog park. From trail head to trail head the hike is 3.5 miles with notable stopping points such as the Lead Open Cut overlook and the B&M #2 Headframe. The trail also has several kiosks where hikers can read the history of Lead and Deadwood, South Dakota. There are numerous animals that are home to this area who frequent this trial and others like it. The most common and notorious animals are deer, snakes, mountain lions and squirrels. The Homestake runs through private property and closed areas owned by the Homestake mine. There are several rules for this trail which include: Staying on the trail, no motorized vehicles and no smoking. The trail is pet friendly and cleaning up after pets is required. The trail is kept and maintained by the Northern Hills Recreation Association. Several man-made lakes, including Sheridan Lake provide fishing and swimming. Spearfish Canyon to the north has many places to rock climb.

== Education ==
It is in Lead-Deadwood School District 40–1.

== Local media ==
AM radio

- KBHB 810
- KKLS 920
- KDSJ 980
- KTOQ 1340
- KBFS 1450

FM radio

- KRCS 93.1
- KKMK 93.9
- KSQY 95.1
- KZZI 95.9
- KOUT 98.7
- KFXS 100.3
- KDDX 101.1
- KFMH 101.9
- KYDT 103.1
- KIQK 104.1

Television

- KHSD Ch. 11 ABC
- KCLO Ch. 16 CBS
- KNBN Ch. 21 NBC
- KBHE-TV Ch. 26 PBS

== Notable people ==
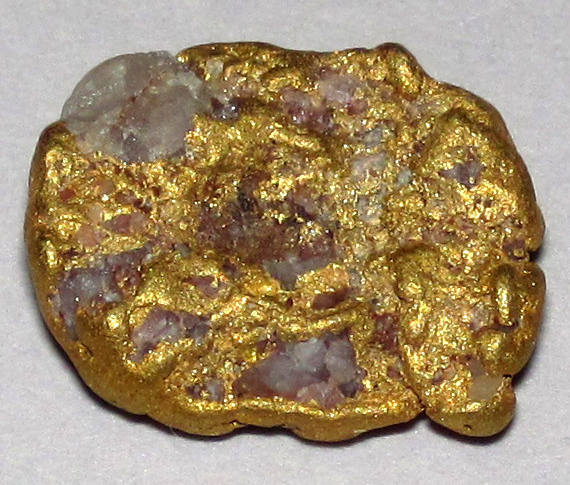
Gold-quartz placer nugget, found near Lead. About 1 cm wide.

- Georgian Adams (1897–1986), food chemist at USDA
- Richard Bullock (1847–1921), American pioneer
- Sean Covel (b. 1976), film producer
- James B. Dunn (1927–2016), South Dakota legislator
- Thomas D. Edwards, Consul General of the United States to Ciudad Juarez
- Stan Gibilisco, writer
- Cynthia Larive, chemist and Chancellor of the University of California, Santa Cruz
- John Miljan (1892–1960), actor
- Charles Moyer (1866–1929), labor leader and former president of the Western Federation of Miners
- William H. Parker (1905–1966), former chief of the Los Angeles Police Department
- Len Rice (1918–1992), baseball player
- Mina P. Shaughnessy (1924–1978), professor at the City University of New York and pioneering scholar of basic writing
- Grace M. Sparkes (1893–1963), booster
- Mike Steponovich (1908–1974), football player with the Boston Redskins
- Charles Windolph (1851–1950), recipient of the Medal of Honor and the last surviving white participant in the Battle of Little Bighorn

== Gallery ==
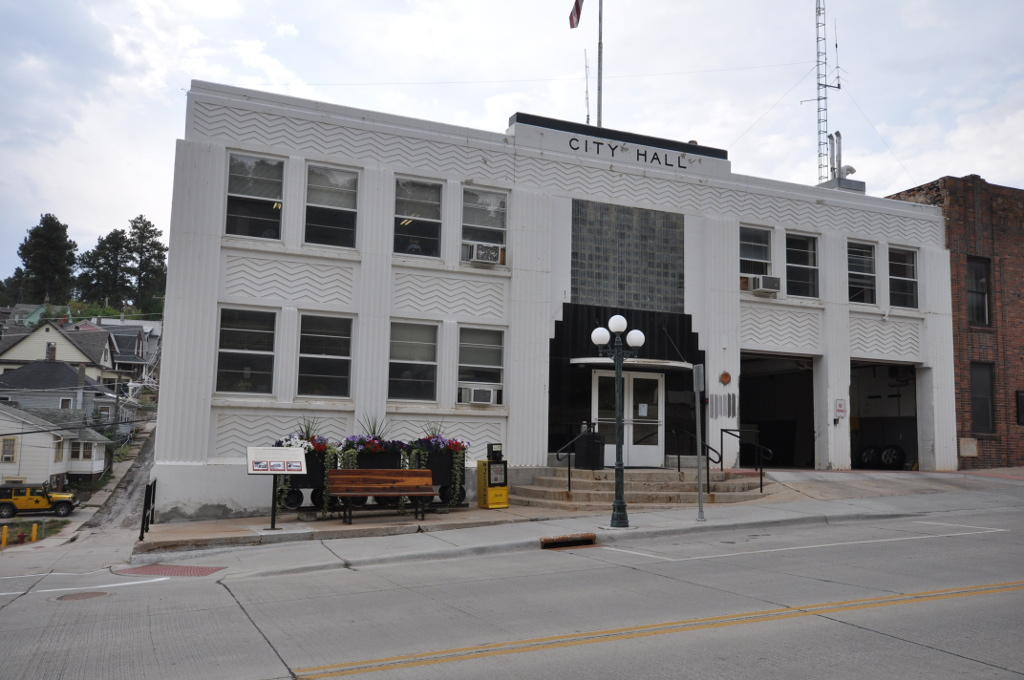
City Hall

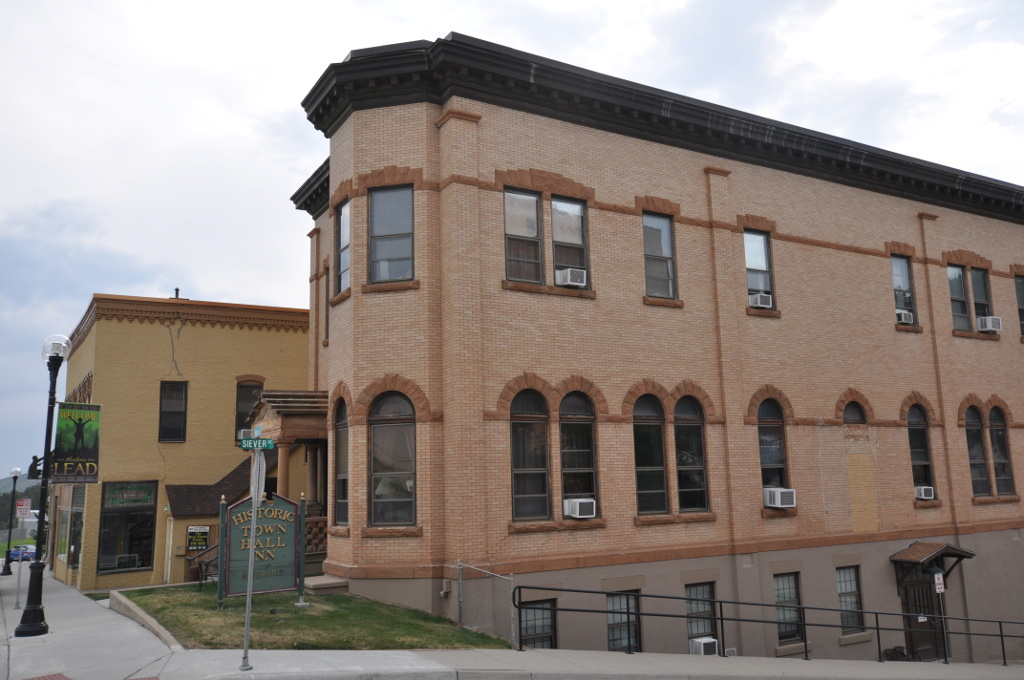
Town Hall Inn, constructed in 1912

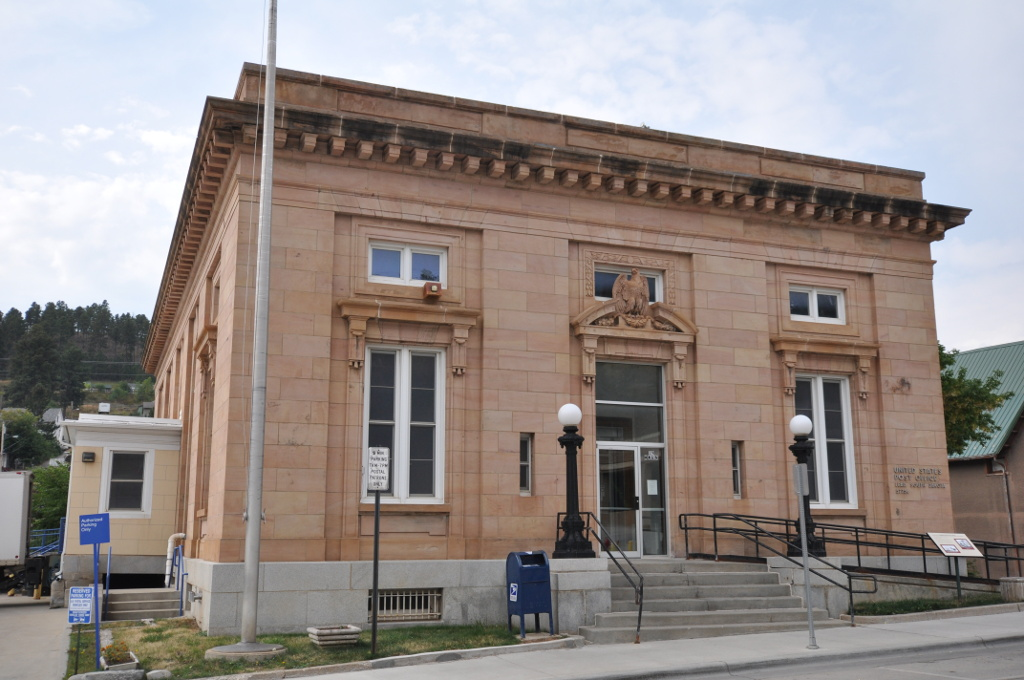
US Post Office

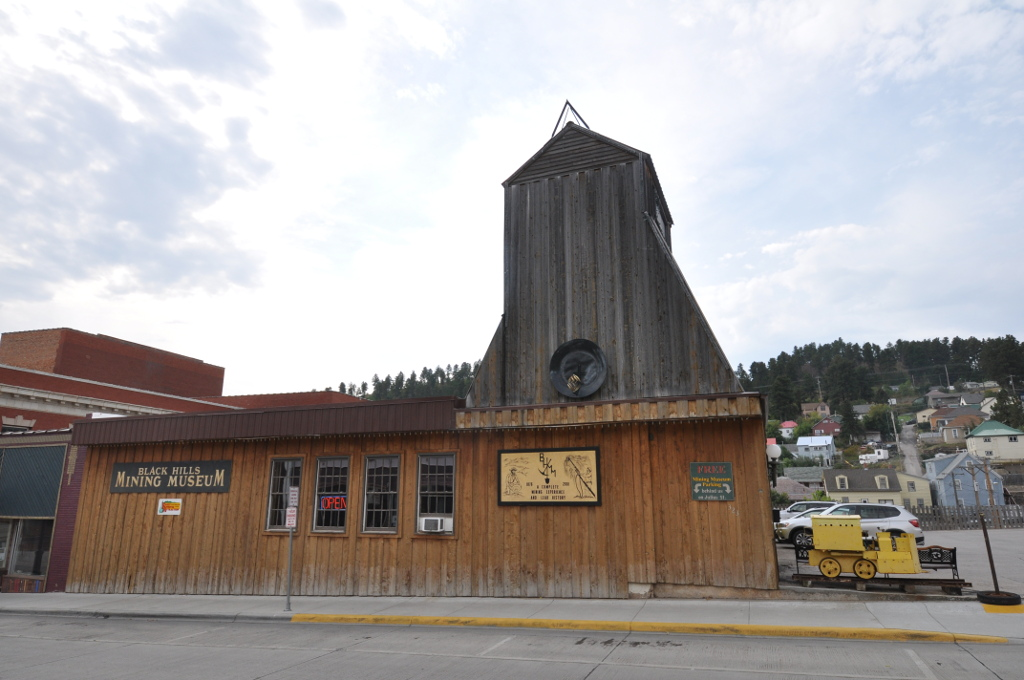
Black Hills Mining Museum

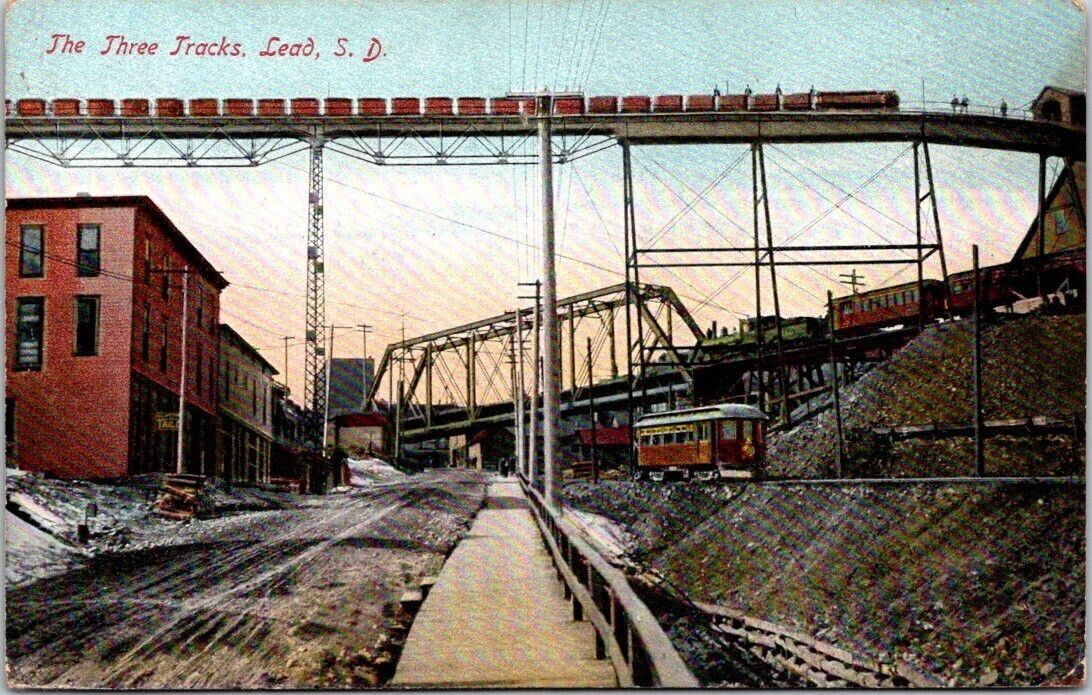
The Three Tracks, c. 1907-1915

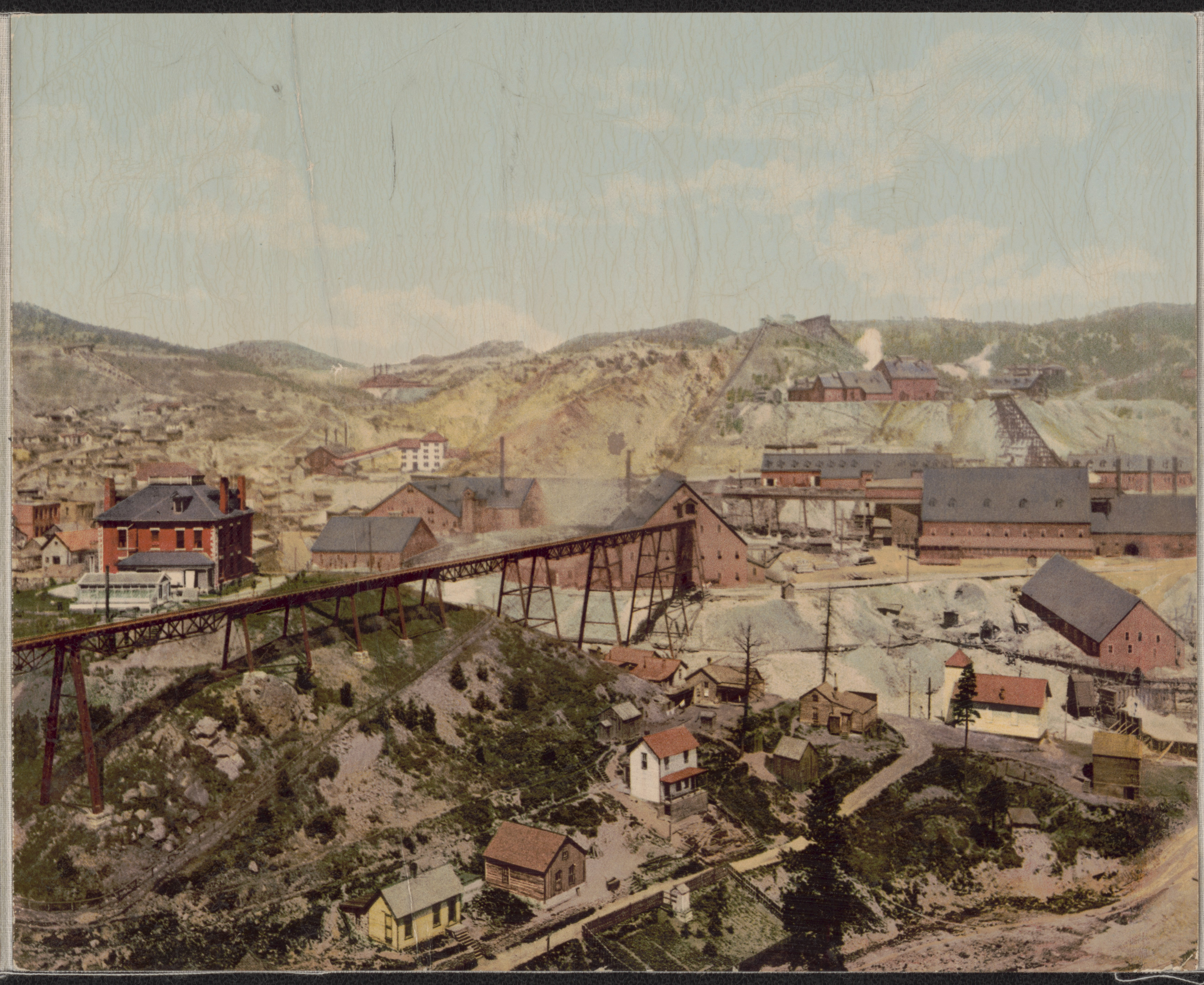
Lead in 1901
