= Stan Gibilisco =

Textbook writer

- Born: 1955
- Died: May 3, 2020 (aged 64–65)
- Occupation: nonfiction writer
- Known for: books in the fields of electronics, general science, mathematics, and computing
- Notable work: Encyclopedia of Electronics, McGraw-Hill Encyclopedia of Personal Computing

Stanley Gibilisco (1955 – 3 May 2020) was a nonfiction writer. He authored books in the fields of electronics, general science, mathematics, and computing.

== Biography ==
Gibilisco began his career in 1977 as a radio technician and editorial assistant at the headquarters of the American Radio Relay League in Newington, Connecticut. Later he worked as a radio-frequency design engineer and technical writer for industry.

In 1982, Stan began writing for TAB Books with editorial offices in Blue Ridge Summit, Pennsylvania. One of the books that he compiled for TAB, the Encyclopedia of Electronics, was named by the American Library Association (ALA) in its list of "Best References of the 1980s." Another of his books, the McGraw-Hill Encyclopedia of Personal Computing, was named as a "Best Reference of 1996" by the ALA.

Stan produced instructional, technical, and general interest videos on YouTube. Subjects include electronics, computers, physics, mathematics, alternative energy, and amateur radio.

Stan lived in Lead, South Dakota, home of the Sanford Underground Research Facility. He was an active amateur radio operator and used the call sign W1GV. He died on 3 May 2020 in Lead, SD.
