= Adelaide Spohn =

American physiologist (1886–1968)

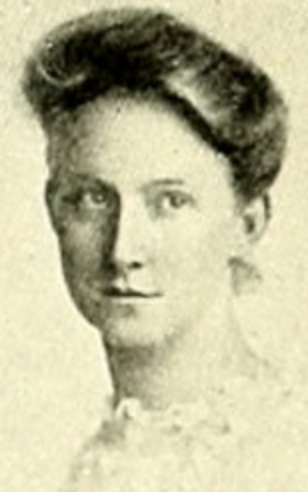
- Adelaide Spohn, from the 1908 yearbook of the University of Chicago
- Born: May 25, 1886; Chicago, Illinois, U.S.
- Died: July 17, 1968 (age 82); New Providence, New Jersey, U.S.
- Occupations: Physiologist, nutritionist, college professor

Adelaide Albertina Spohn (May 25, 1886 – July 17, 1968) was an American physiologist, nutritionist, and college professor. She was a professor at Cornell University in the 1920s, and a nutritionist based in Chicago in the 1930s and 1940s.

== Early life and education ==
Spohn was born in Chicago, the daughter of Jacob Spohn and Anna Catherine Kruse Spohn. Her parents were both born in Germany. She graduated from the University of Chicago in 1908, and earned a master's degree in physiology from the University of Chicago in 1913, with a thesis titled "Studies in the Kanthoproteic Reaction". She earned a Ph.D. at Columbia University in 1922, with a dissertation titled "A Critical Investigation and an Application of the Rat Growth Method for the Study of Vitamin B".

Petroleum geologist Albert Dudley Brokaw was married to Spohn's younger sister, Clara Spohn.

== Career ==
Spohn taught high school and was a laboratory assistant while she was completing her graduate studies. She worked at the Carnegie Institution in Washington, D.C. from 1911 to 1915. She taught chemistry at Teachers College, Columbia University from 1915 to 1916, at Northwestern University from 1918 to 1919, and at Pratt Institute from 1919 to 1920.

After completing her doctoral work, Spohn was a professor of nutrition in the department of home economics at Cornell University, where her colleagues included Martha Van Rensselaer, Flora Rose, Claribel Nye, Beulah Blackmore, and other founders of the field. In the early 1930s, she moved back to Chicago, where she was director of nutritional services for the Illinois Emergency Relief Commission, and nutritionist on staff at the Elizabeth McCormick Memorial Fund, into the 1940s. In Chicago, she wrote newspaper columns and spoke to community groups about nutrition. She was a charter member of the American Institute of Nutrition.

== Publications ==
- "Studies in the Physiology of Reproduction in Birds" (1916, with Oscar Riddle)
- A Critical Investigation and an Application of the Rat Growth Method for the Study of Vitamin B (1922, with H. C. Sherman)
- "The antiscorbutic vitamin in home-canned carrots" (1931, with Amy Hunter)
- "The antiscorbutic vitamin in the juice of home-canned tomatoes" (1931)
- "Choosing Foods Wisely" (1933)
- "Vitamins Essential for Healthy Living" (1936)
- "Build Reserve Vigor with Food, Exercise" (1936)
- "Nutritional and Dietary Inadequacies among City Children from Different Socio-Economic Groups" (1943, with Martha C. Hardy, Gertrude Austin, Sarah McGiffert, Edna Mohr, and Agnes B. Peterson)

== Personal life ==
Spohn died in 1968, at the age of 82, in New Providence, New Jersey. The Chicago Tribune described her as a "pioneer in the application of biochemistry and scientific research to nutritional needs".
