= Mary Letitia Caldwell =

American chemist (1890–1972)

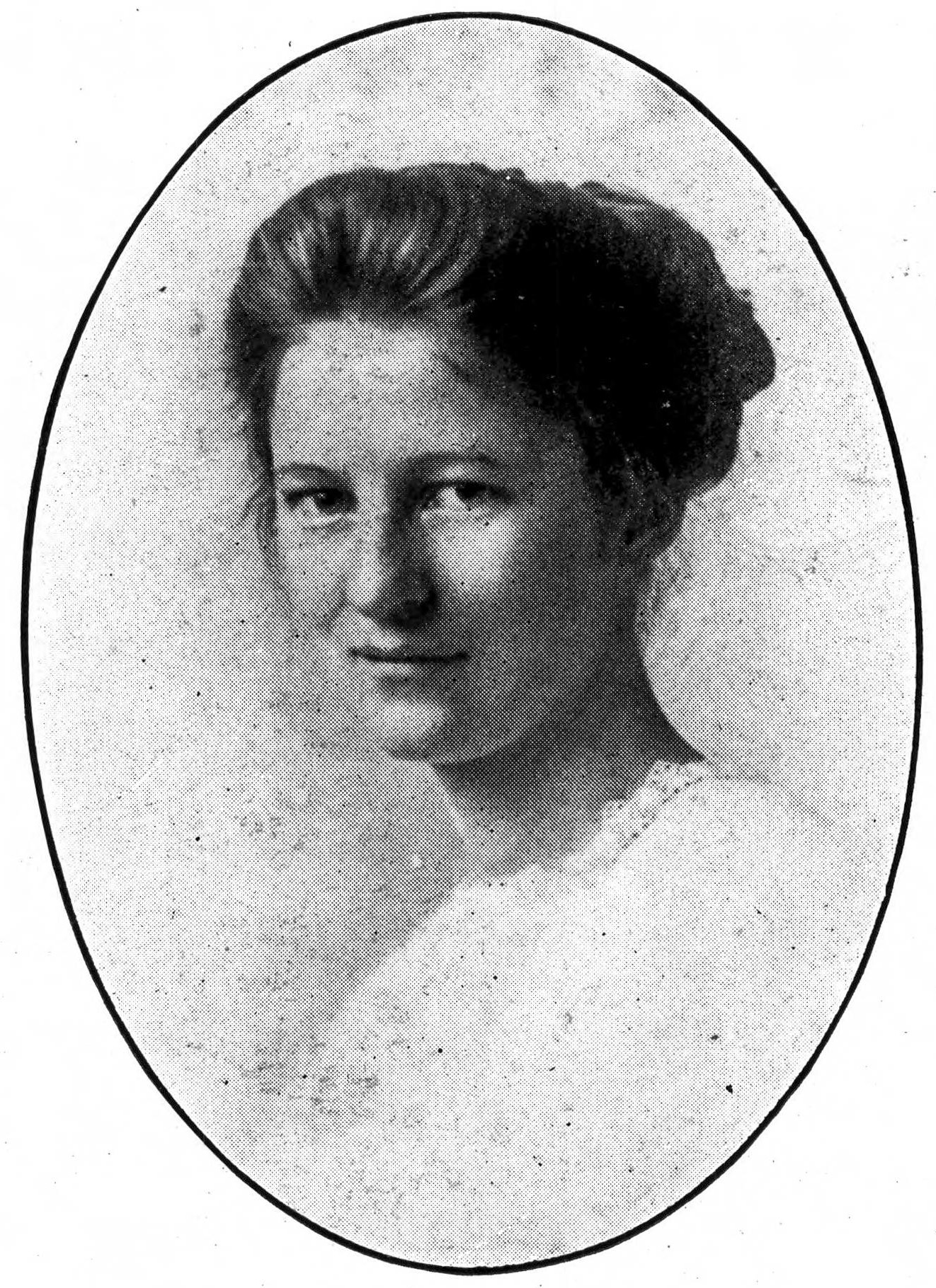
- Caldwell in 1913
- Born: December 18, 1890; Bogotá, Colombia
- Died: July 1, 1972 (aged 81); Fishkill, New York
- Education: Western College for Women, Columbia University
- Awards: Garvan–Olin Medal (1960)
- Scientific career
- Fields: Chemistry
- Workplaces: Columbia University
- Thesis: An experimental study of certain basic amino acids (1921)
- Doctoral advisor: Henry Clapp Sherman
- Doctoral students: Marie Maynard Daly

Mary Letitia Caldwell (December 18, 1890 – July 1, 1972) was an American chemist. She was an instructor at Western College teaching chemistry. Mary was in a wheelchair due to muscular disability. Most of her work centered on amylase, a starch enzyme, most notably finding a method for purifying crystalline porcine pancreatic amylase. She spent sixty years doing this.

== Early life and education ==
Caldwell was born in Bogotá, Colombia, to missionaries from the USA. She earned her bachelor's degree from the Western College for Women in 1913 and taught at the school until 1918. She earned her M.A. and Ph.D. from Columbia University in 1919 and 1921. She had a progressive muscular disorder which made her reliant on a wheelchair for life. She came from a family of five siblings, all of whom valued higher education. She then became the first woman instructor in the chemistry department at Columbia University. In 1951 she retired from teaching and began her studies in enzymes, specifically amylase.

== Career ==
After graduating from graduate school at Columbia University, Caldwell became the first Chemistry professor at Columbia University from 1948 to 1949. She became the only female member of the senior faculty in the chemistry department, becoming the first woman to attain the rank of assistant professor at Columbia. She attained the rank of full professor in 1948.

Caldwell had a progressive muscular disability, and began using a wheelchair by 1960. Despite this, her 9th floor office at her research facility, Chandler Hall, never changed. In 1960 she received the Garvan Medal from the American Chemical Society, an honor awarded annually to a US female chemist.

During her time as a chemist, Caldwell did research on amylase. She spent a lot of her time trying to purify enzymes because she was not satisfied with the commercial material. She attempted to find a more pure form of amylase and she was able to develop a method for isolating crystalline pancreatic enzymes.

== Awards and accomplishments ==
After receiving her M.S. and Ph.D. at Columbia University in 1919 and 1921, respectively, Caldwell was hired as an instructor in 1922. She eventually became the first female professor of chemistry in 1948, and the only female senior faculty member of the chemistry department at Columbia University at the time.

In 1960, Caldwell was awarded the Garvan Medal by the American Chemistry Society for her research on amylase. The Garvan Medal specifically recognizes women who have made a significant contribution to the field of Chemistry. Caldwell developed a method to isolate crystalline pancreatic enzymes that is now used by laboratories all throughout America and Europe.
