= Watertown High School (South Dakota) =

Coordinates: 44.902054°N 97.097747°W

Watertown Senior High School

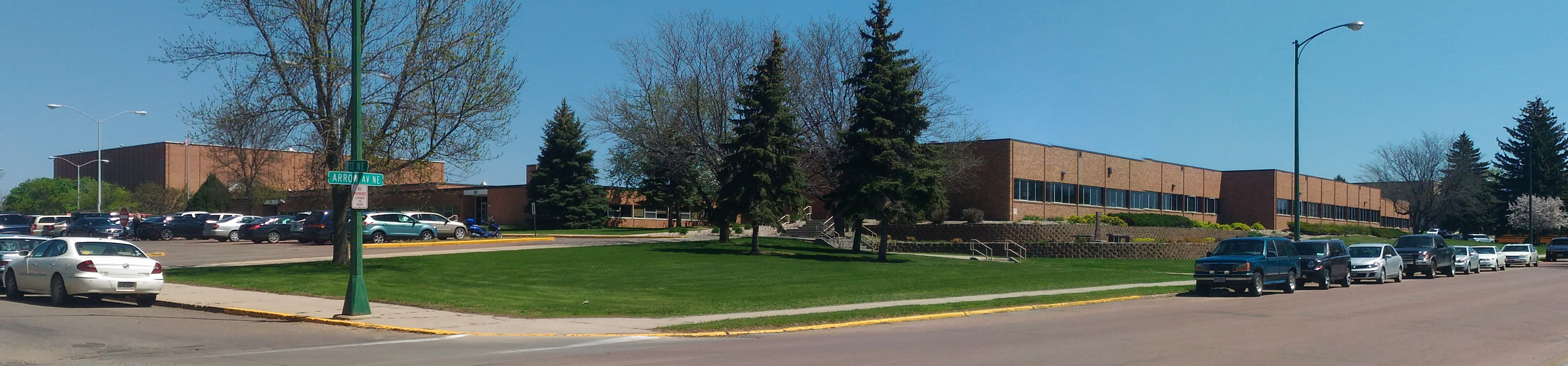
- Watertown High School from Arrow Ave.
- 209 9th ST NE; Watertown, SD 57201

Information
- Type: Public
- School district: Watertown School District 14-4
- Superintendent: Jeff Danielsen
- Teaching staff: 72.39 (FTE)
- Grades: 9-12
- Enrollment: 1,222 (2023-2024)
- Student to teacher ratio: 16.88
- Colors: Purple, Gold, White
- Athletics: AA
- Athletics conference: Eastern South Dakota (ESD)
- Mascot: Arrows
- Website: Official Website

Watertown High School (WHS) is a public high school in Watertown, South Dakota. The school was the first in the state and the second in the United States in which every student and teacher was issued a laptop computer.

== Academics ==
Watertown High School has a dual-enrollment program with the neighboring Lake Area Technical College campus, allowing students to take college level course during their junior and senior years. WHS also allows students to take courses directly through Mount Marty University and South Dakota State University.

In addition, the nearby Northeast Technical High School has partnered with WHS, as it has with 12 other high schools in the surrounding area, to provide courses promoting hands-on career exploration. Courses' topics include, but are not limited to, machine tools, building trades, engineering, automotive, welding, woodworking, agriculture, health sciences, human services, and culinary arts. In 2025, it was announced that a collaboration between WHS, NTHS, LATC, and MMU would allow students to receive college credit for courses offered at NTHS.

During the 2020-21 academic year, the Civil Rights Data Collection (CRDC) survey administered through the U.S. Department of Education's Office for Civil Rights reported 131 out of 1,261 students (10.4% of the student population) were enrolled in Advanced Placement (AP) courses at WHS.

== Extracurricular activities ==
=== Performing Arts ===
WHS offers students with the opportunity to participate in band, orchestra, chorus, theater, and other related activities. The school's marching band performs halftime shows during football games. Students can audition for the South Dakota All-State Band and Orchestra, as well as South Dakota Honor Choir and All-State Chorus.

WHS participates in South Dakota's annual One-Act Play festival.

=== Competitive speech activities ===
The WHS oral interpretation program was among the first 100 chartered squads in the National Forensics League. The department has produced a number of Truman scholars.

Forensic events offered are: (State championships are listed to the right)

- Policy Debate: 2006, 2016

=== Athletics ===
Watertown High School's girl's activities include competitive cheer, competitive dance, basketball, cross country, golf, powerlifting, soccer, tennis, track & field, wrestling, gymnastics, sideline cheer, softball, and volleyball. Boys' sports include baseball, basketball, cross country, golf, powerlifting, soccer, tennis, track & field, wrestling, and football. These activities are sanctioned by the South Dakota High School Activities Association.

The Watertown Arrows formerly used the Watertown Stadium, which was constructed in the 1930s as a Works Progress Administration project, to host athletic events such as football and baseball. In June 2023, construction of a new facility began in the location of the preexisting track. In 2025, the facility's construction was completed, accommodating athletic events for the soccer, football, and track teams. The new complex introduced new turf, a new scoreboard, and more.

The Allen Mitchell Athletic Complex in Watertown, South Dakota

==== State championships ====
Below is a table that lists all of Watertown High School's state championships.

State Championships
Season	Sport	Number	Year(s)
Fall	Football	2	1996, 2001, 2024
Fall	Volleyball	2	1997, 2017
Fall	Golf, Boys	10	1929, 1930, 1931, 1932, 1935, 1936, 1949, 1950, 1957, 1971
Fall	Cross Country, Girls	1	2001
Winter	Basketball, Boys	4	1959, 1992, 1999, 2008
Winter	Basketball, Girls	4	1976, 1993, 2007, 2009
Winter	Wrestling	10	1961, 1968, 1971, 1973, 1985, 1992, 1993, 1999, 2000, 2003
Winter	Gymnastics	3	2006, 2009, 2010
Spring	Tennis, Boys	4	1992, 1993, 1994, 2013
Spring	Track & field, Boys	5	1915, 1916, 1929, 1930, 1998
Spring	Track & field, Girls	1	1978
Spring	Golf, Girls	2	1978, 1979
Total		48	

== Notable alumni ==
Notable Watertown High School alumni include:

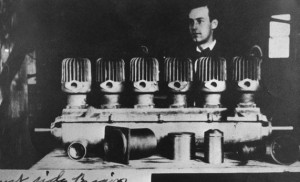
Stephen Foster Briggs,
1903,
inventor of the Briggs & Stratton engine.

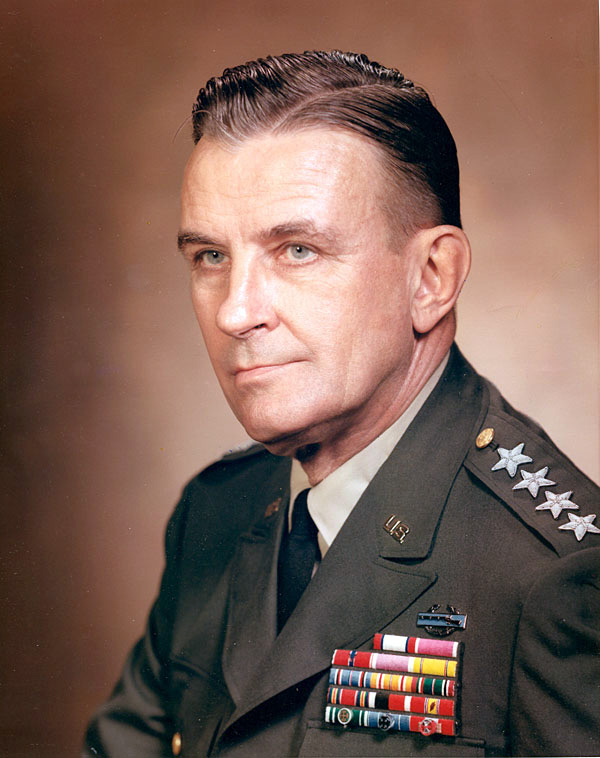
George R. Mather.
1929,
Commander in-chief of U.S. Army, United States Southern Command.

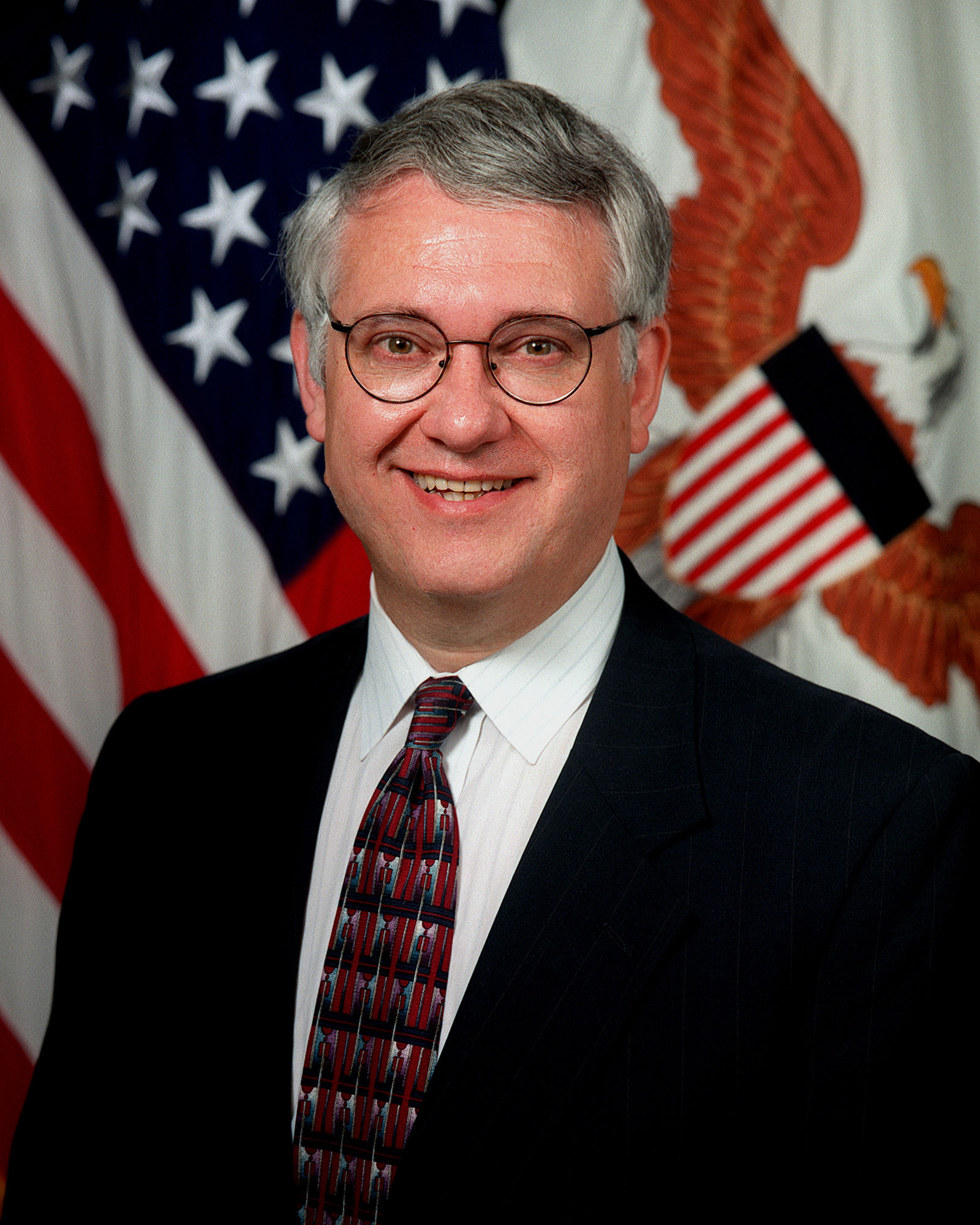
John Hamre,
1968,
U.S. Deputy Secretary of Defense, 1997–2000.

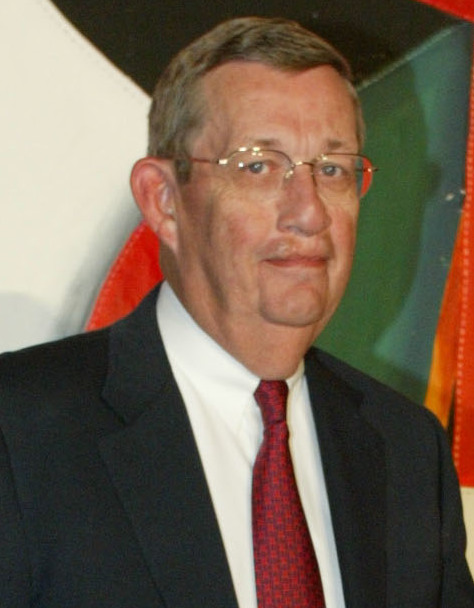
Lee Raymond,
1956,
CEO and President, ExxonMobil.

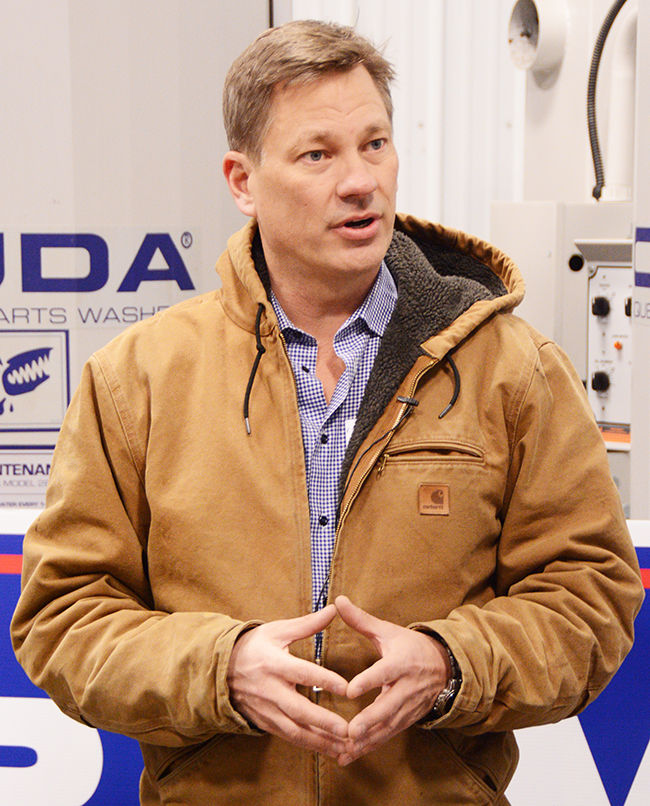
Neal Tapio,
1988,
Trump Presidential Campaign Director
- Stephen Foster Briggs (1903), inventor, Briggs & Stratton engine and co-founder of the Briggs & Stratton manufacturing company.
- Robert J. Fox, Catholic Priest, promoter of Our Lady of Fatima Devotions and the Blue Army
- Cleveland L. Abbott (1912), Tuskegee Institute educator and coach
- George R. Mather (1929), Commander in-chief of U.S. Army, United States Southern Command
- Ross Horning (1939), historian
- Sylvia Bacon (1949), Judge, Superior Court of the District of Columbia and was a Nixon and Reagan shortlist candidate for the United States Supreme Court
- Charles B. Kornmann (1955), current Judge, United States District Court for the District of South Dakota
- Bob Scholtz (1955), NFL offensive lineman for the Detroit Lions, New York Giants, and New Orleans Saints
- Jake Krull (1956), U.S. General and South Dakota state senator
- Lee Raymond (1956), CEO and President, ExxonMobil
- Terry Redlin (1956), Wildlife artist and philanthropist of the Redlin Art Center
- Roger Zwieg (1960), NASA astronaut and test pilot
- John Hamre (1968), U.S. Deputy Secretary of Defense, Clinton administration, and international relations specialist
- Neal Tapio (1988), current candidate for U.S. Representative for South Dakota's at-large congressional district and Trump presidential campaign director for South Dakota.
- Timmy Williams (1999), American comedian, The Whitest Kids U' Know

== Noted faculty ==
- Jim Marking, former Watertown High School basketball coach and former South Dakota State Jackrabbits men's basketball coach
- Brian Norberg, former Watertown High School basketball coach, South Dakota State men's basketball all-time leader in assists
- Vic Godfrey, former Watertown High School track coach, and head coach of Kingdom of Bahrain 1984 and 1989 Olympic Track teams.
- Scott Hardie, current Watertown School Board member and former NASA engineer on Challenger and Columbia.
