= KSDR =

KSDR may refer to:

- KSDR-FM, a radio station (92.9 FM) licensed to Watertown, South Dakota, United States
- KSDR (AM), a radio station (1480 AM) licensed to Watertown, South Dakota, United States
