= Lake Kampeska =

Lake in the state of South Dakota, United States

- Bdé Kampeska
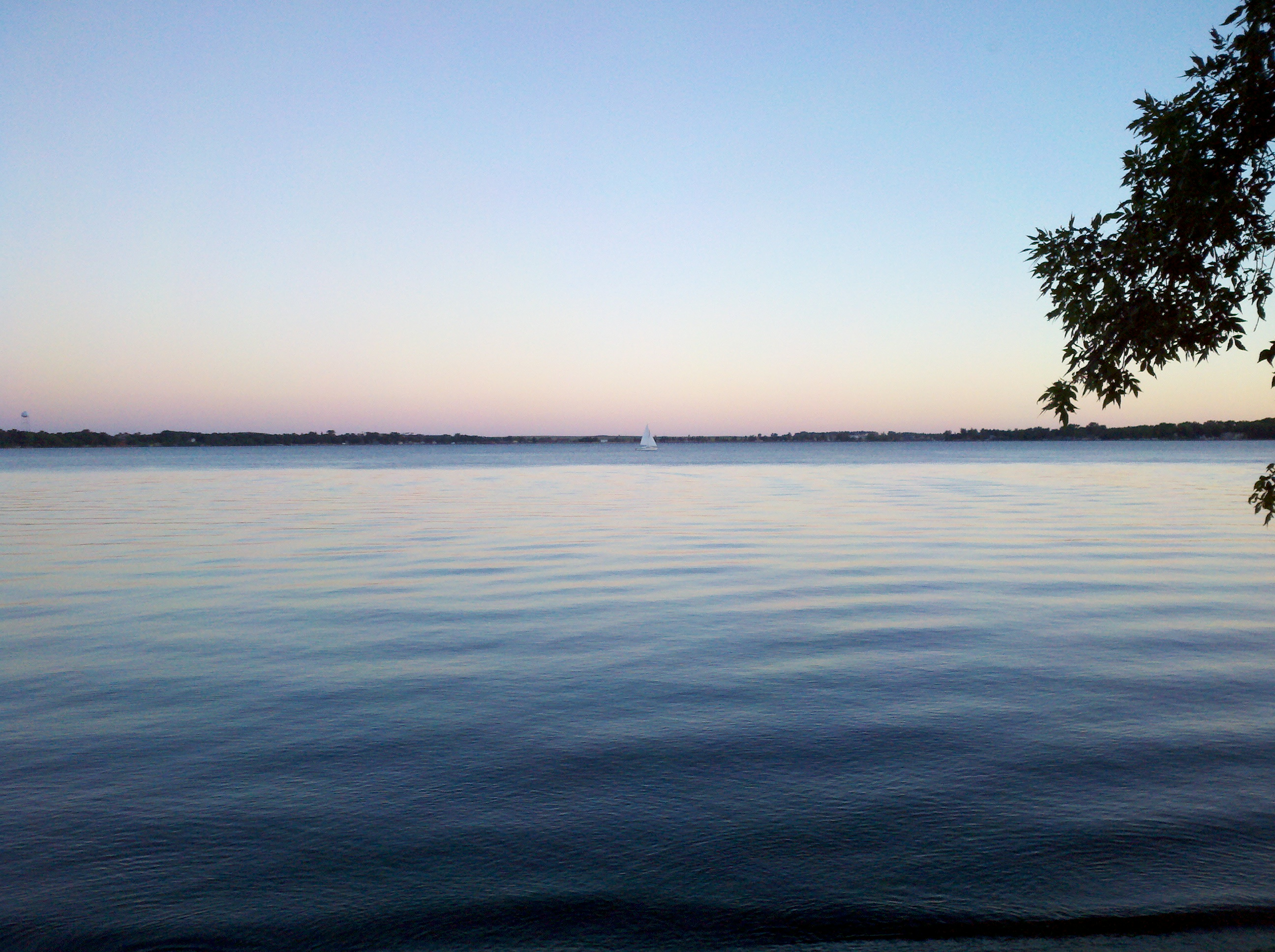
- Sailboat on Lake Kampeska taken from the shore at Memorial Park on 1 September 2013

- Location within South Dakota Location within the United States

- 2002 USGS Data
- Location: Codington / South Dakota, United States (Lake Township)
- Coordinates: 44°55′53.51″N 97°12′27.65″W
- Type: Glacial lake
- Primary inflows: Big Sioux River
- Primary outflows: Big Sioux River
- Catchment area: 20,433 acres (83 km^{2})
- Basin countries: United States
- Max. length: 4.77 mi (8 km)
- Max. width: 2.3 mi (4 km)
- Surface area: 5,250 acres (21 km^{2})
- Average depth: 7 ft (2 m)
- Max. depth: 16 ft (5 m)
- Water volume: 51,000 acre⋅ft (62,908 ML)
- Shore length^{1}: 13.5 mi (20 km)
- Surface elevation: 1,715.2 ft (523 m)
- Frozen: Winter months
- Settlements: Kampeska City (formerly); Watertown, South Dakota
- ^{1} Shore length is not a well-defined measure.

Lake Kampeska is a 5,250-acre (21 km^{2}) inland glacial lake in the U.S. state of South Dakota. It is located west-northwest of Watertown, South Dakota and lies entirely within Codington County and the Coteau des Prairies. The lake is naturally shaped and the most urban developed lake in South Dakota with approximately 13.5 miles (20 km) of residential shoreline. Lake Kampeska is connected to the Big Sioux River through a single inlet-outlet channel located on the northeast side. It is the third largest natural lake within the borders of South Dakota.

Lake Kampeska is well-known for its depictions in art from wildlife and nature artists such as Terry Redlin, John Greene, John Wilson, and Joshua Spies. Lake Kampeska is perhaps featured most prominently in the artworks of Terry Redlin and are displayed in the Redlin Art Center nearby in Watertown, South Dakota. It is located in the north near the grainery.

== History ==
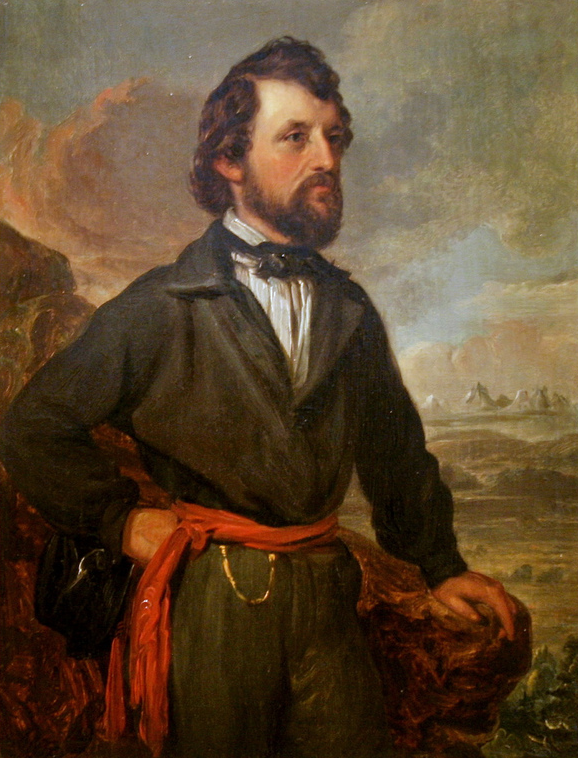
John C. Fremont arrived in the area in 1838.

It is known in the expressive language of the Dakotas as Lake Kampeska, signifying the "Lake of the Shining Shells."

Famous pathfinder John C. Fremont and scientist Joseph Nicollet explored this region of Dakota Territory approximately in May or June 1838. In their undated notes they described the area as the "lake country of the coteau prairie." Some of their findings appear to be second hand accounts of the area. However, the expedition failed to include some of the lakes of the area on their map including, Kampeska.

Lake Kampeska's settlement predates Watertown and statehood of South Dakota. Initially founded as Kampeska City, modern-day Codington County's borders were drawn in such a way that Lake Kampeska would be at the geographical epicenter of the county. Chicago and North Western Railway operated near Lake Kampeska beginning in 1873.

Codington, a Congregational clergyman, carved out the geographical location for the purpose of making the area a county-seat town. Kampeska City was the county-seat of Lake Kampeska County, until July 19, 1878, when a vote of the people removed the county-seat to Watertown after the railroad reactivated a line through that area. At the time of the vote, Watertown was not in fact a town.

Towards the end of the 1870s, the northern shore of Lake Kampeska was designated by Arthur C. Mellette and territorial officials to serve as the location of the Capitol Building. However, when Benjamin Harrison signed South Dakota into statehood, the designation was changed to the geographic center of the state.

The name Kampeska is not associated with founders of Watertown, the Kemp family.

== Recreation ==
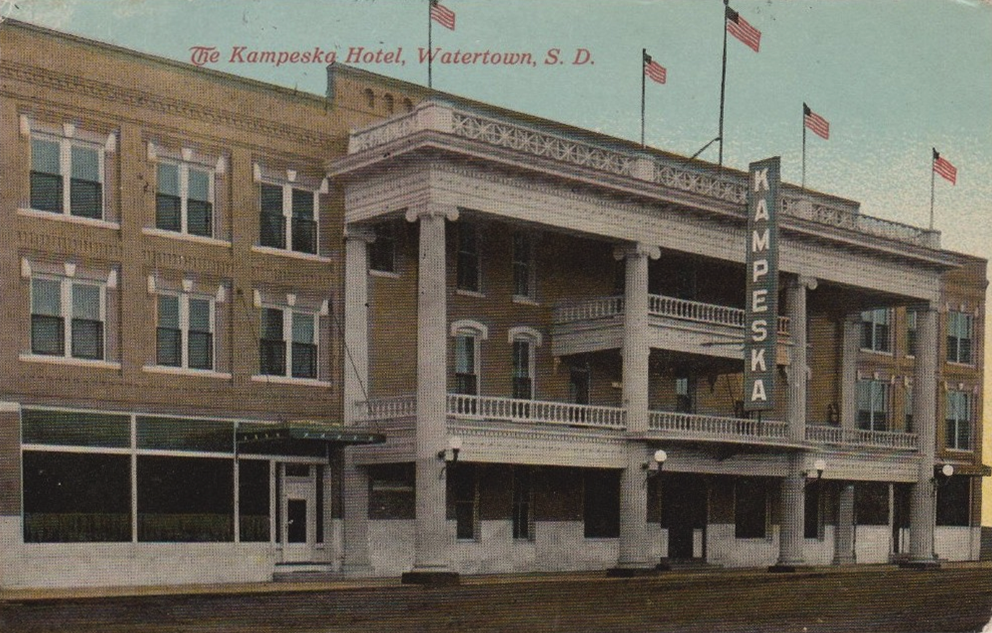
Kampeska Hotel circa 1913.

Lake Kampeska is a popular site for recreational activities including fishing, sail boating, biking, swimming, waterskiing, camping, and picnicking.

Public access to Lake Kampeska has locations on the north, east, south (State Recreation Area), and west shores of the lake. Lake Kampeska has one state park, Sandy Shores, one county owned park, Memorial Park, and two city owned parks, Jackson Park and Stokes-Thomas City Park.

Lake Kampeska also has 15 miles of bike trails that parallel it, though homes and a road generally separate the trails from views of the lake. Two golf courses also border the lake; Prairie Winds Golf Course to the south and Cattail Crossing Golf Course to the south-east.

Lake Kampeska is primarily managed as a Walleye and Smallmouth Bass fishery. Lake Kampeska contains black bullhead, black crappie, white crappie, bluegill, carp, channel catfish, smallmouth bass, white bass, northern pike, sunfish, rock bass, walleye, white sucker, yellow bullhead, and yellow perch.

== Boating ==
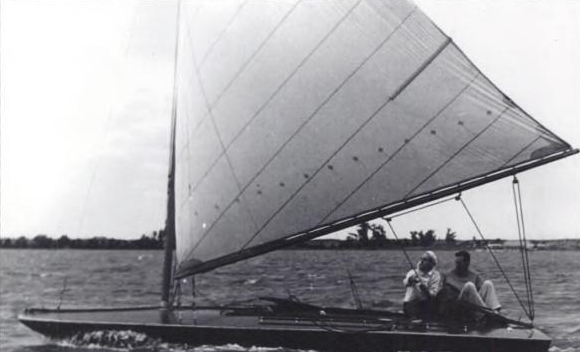
Sailboat on the southern edge of Kampeska circa 1900.

Boats of all sizes and horsepowers may be legally launched on Lake Kampeska. There is a no-wake zone in Hidden Valley on the east side of the lake. Although there are some sailboat enthusiasts who recreate on the lake, motorboats are in the clear majority in regard to quantity.

The lake is also home to the Kampeska Yacht Club, which hosts the annual sail boating competition, the Kampeska Cup Regatta.

== Environmental issues ==
Lake Kampeska briefly experienced problems with pollution from fertilizer and surface runoff until the 1990s. Although pollution remains an ongoing issue, conditions have improved and water quality is now closely monitored.

A weir installed on the inlet-outlet channel of Lake Kampeska is intended to slow the input of sediments to the lake basin. When the Big Sioux River is high, water enters Lake Kampeska. Conversely, when the water level in Lake Kampeska is higher than the Big Sioux River and above the weir, water exits Lake Kampeska through the v-notch.

The lake has experienced catastrophic flooding from rapid snow melts in recent years. In 1997, flooding of Lake Kampeska drew attention of the White House, sending then-U.S. Vice President Al Gore to visit the flooding.

== In popular culture & art ==
Terry Redlin painted numerous artworks featuring landmarks of the area, such as Lake Kampeska Lodge, Sandy Shores, Memorial Park, and homes along the lake. Many of the paintings of the lake have received national interest, featured in Ducks Unlimited and on the cover of Farmer Magazine. Redlin fished on the lake since childhood and owned a home on Lake Kampeska until 2007. Among others, Neal Tapio, Nancy Turbak Berry, Fred H. Hildebrandt, Doron Jensen, and Arthur C. Mellette have previously maintained residences on the lake. Artists such as John Wilson, John Greene, and Joshua Spies have also used Lake Kampeska as inspiration for their respective artwork.

According to popular legend, the Lake Kampeska Monster, possibly a lake sturgeon existed in excess of 7 feet (2 m). However, there have been no sightings since the 1880s.

== See also ==
- Watertown, South Dakota
- Redlin Art Center
- Geography of South Dakota
- List of lakes in South Dakota
- Big Sioux River
- The Legend of Ki-Yi
