= Credlin (surname) =

Credlin is a surname. Notable people with the surname include:

- Leo Credlin (1903–1983), Australian rules footballer
- Peta Credlin (born 1971), Australian political commentator and public servant

== See also ==
- Redlin (surname)
