= Kampeska =

Kampeska may refer to:

- Lake Kampeska, a glacial lake in South Dakota.
- Kampeska, South Dakota, an unincorporated community in Codington County, South Dakota.
