= Redlin (surname) =

Redlin is a surname of German origin. Notable people with the surname include:

- Rolland W. Redlin (1920–2011), American politician
- Terry Redlin (1937–2016), American artist
  - Redlin Art Center
