= Mount Hope Cemetery (Watertown, South Dakota) =

- Mount Hope Cemetery Mausoleum
- U.S. National Register of Historic Places
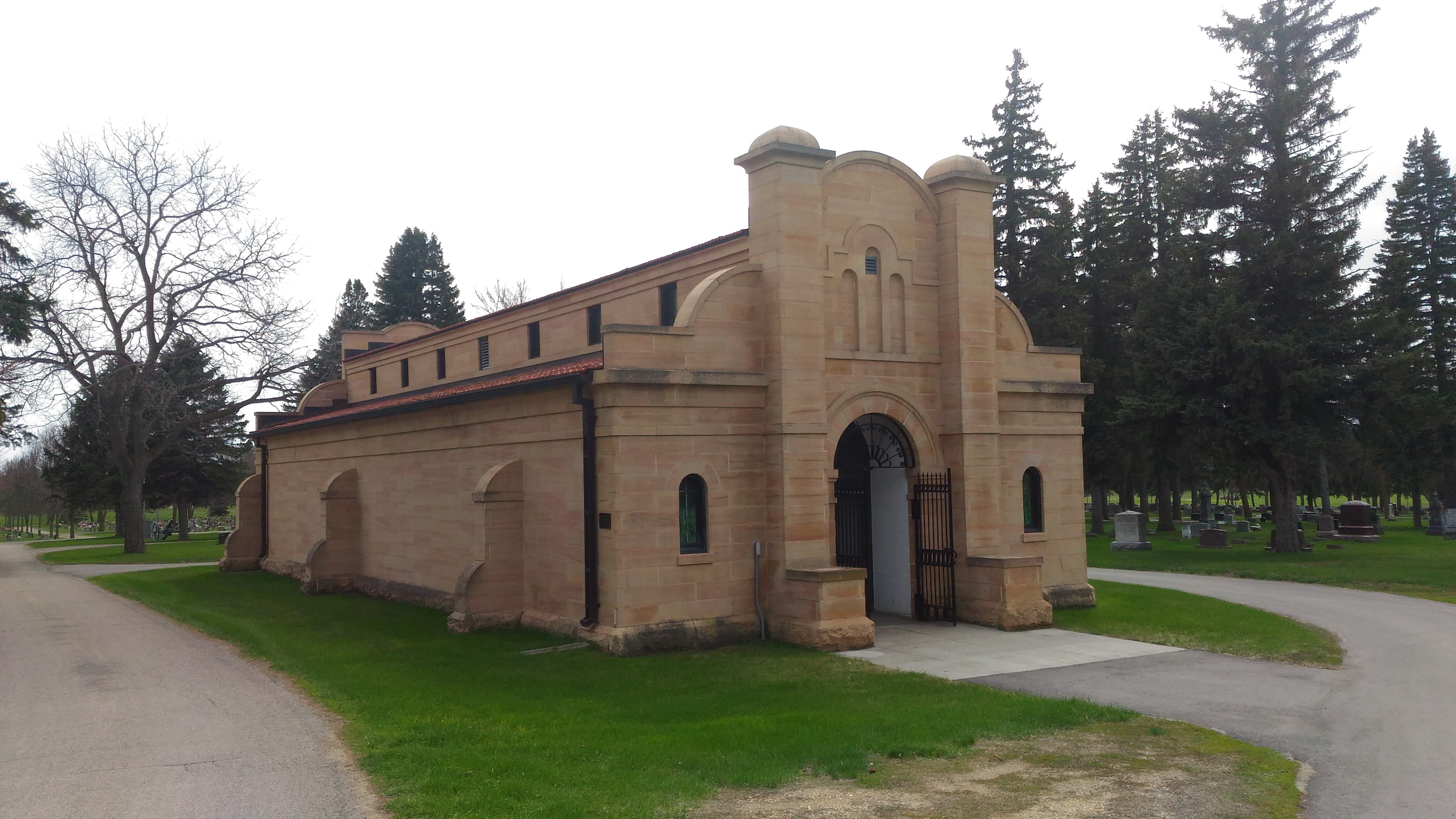
- Mausoleum at Mount Hope Cemetery, April 2017

- Location within South Dakota Location within the United States
- Nearest city: Watertown, South Dakota
- Coordinates: 44°54′59″N 97°5′56″W
- Built: 1911
- Architect: South Dakota Mausoleum Corp.
- NRHP reference No.: 86001500
- Added to NRHP: 13 August 1986

Mount Hope Cemetery is a municipal cemetery located at 11th Street East and 14th Avenue North, Watertown, South Dakota. Influenced by the 19th century rural cemetery movement, the 40-acres of land that would become the cemetery was purchased by the city from the Winona and St. Peter Railroad for $120. The earliest recorded burial was in 1881. As of April 2017, there have been about 12,300 interments at Mount Hope.

== Mausoleum ==
The central mausoleum at Mount Hope Cemetery was built in 1911 and was added to the National Register of Historic Places in 1986. The mausoleum has 100 crypts. It is considered full, and casket burials are no longer performed. Around 2011, a receiving room was converted into a columbarium, with cinerary urns displayed behind glass for public viewing.

== Notable interments ==
- John Banvard (1815–1891), painter
- Jake Krull (1938–2016), U.S. General and South Dakota state senator
- Henry Pease (1835–1907), U.S. Senator from Mississippi and South Dakota state senator
