= KDLO =

KDLO may refer to:

- KDLO-TV, a television station (Channel 3 digital) licensed to Florence, South Dakota, United States
- KDLO-FM, a radio station (96.9 FM) licensed to Watertown, South Dakota, United States
- The ICAO airport code for Delano Municipal Airport in Delano, California, United States
