= Old Post Office (Watertown, South Dakota) =

- Watertown Post Office
- U.S. National Register of Historic Places
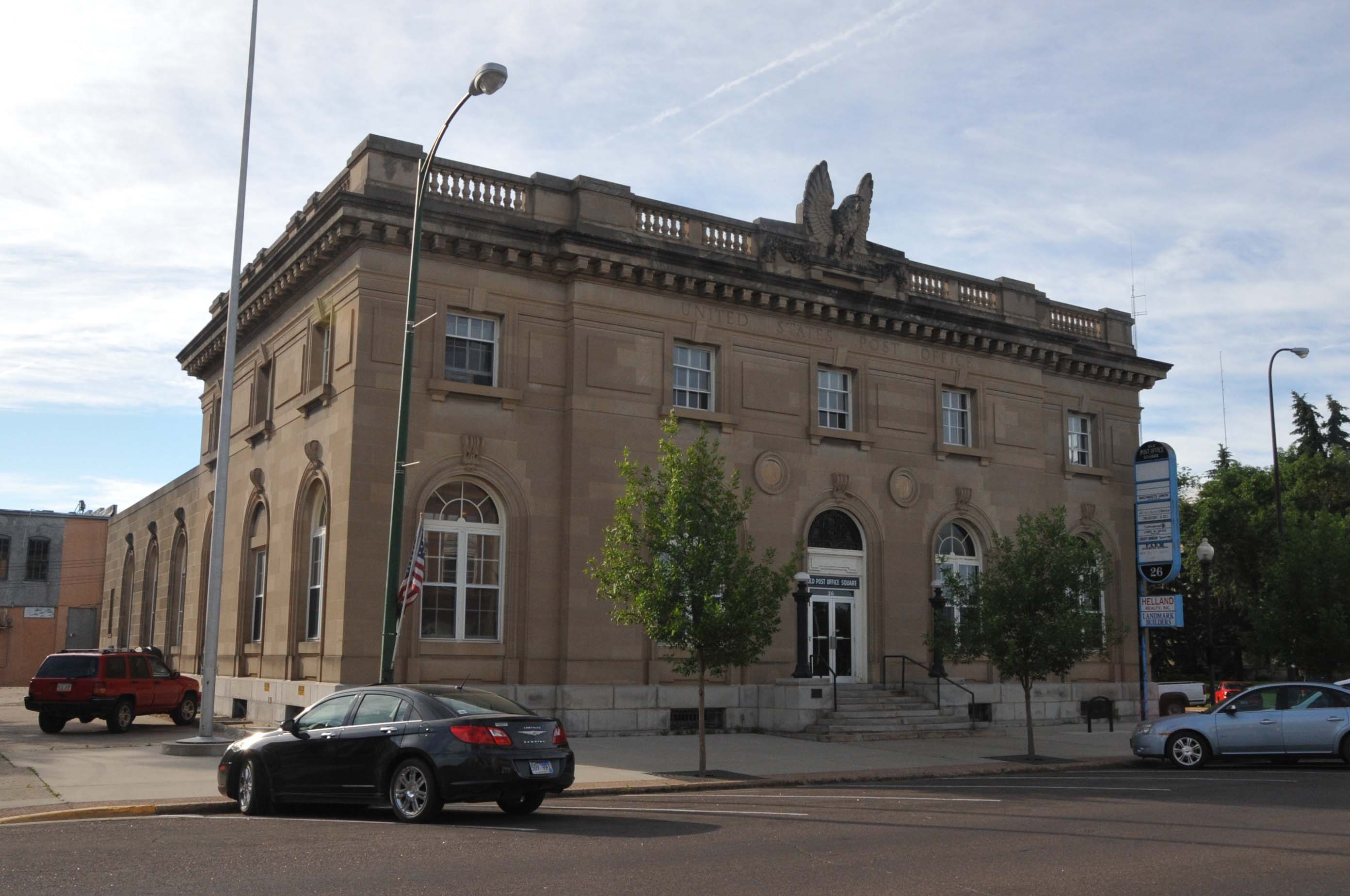

- Location within South Dakota Location within the United States
- Nearest city: Watertown, South Dakota
- Coordinates: 44°53′58″N 97°06′51″W
- Built: 1908
- NRHP reference No.: 76001726
- Added to NRHP: 12 December 1976

The Old Post Office (NRHP-listed as Watertown Post Office) is a historic building located at 26 South Broadway in Watertown, South Dakota.

The Watertown Post Office constructed in 1908 and served until 1976. From 1976 to 2009, it was known as Old Post Office Square, and housed several tenants. From 2009 to 2014, the building was home to KXLG in Watertown. It is currently the law office of Nancy Turbak Berry.

The building was added to the National Register of Historic Places in 1976.
