= KJBB =

KJBB may refer to:

- KJBB or KJVB, is a King James Bible Believer, someone who is part of the King James Only movement
- KJBB-LP, a low-power radio station (94.7 FM) licensed to serve Brownsboro, Texas, United States
- KPGT, a radio station (89.1 FM) licensed to serve Watertown, South Dakota, United States, which held the call sign KJBB from 2000 to 2012
