= Harmony Hill High School =

Defunct Catholic girls boarding school in South Dakota

Coordinates: 44.86803°N 97.11749°W

Information
- School type: Boarding high school
- Religious affiliation: Catholicism
- Established: 1967
- Closed: 1974

Harmony Hill High School was a Catholic girls boarding school in Watertown, South Dakota. It was built in 1967 and operated as a high school until 1974. From 1972 to 1995 the building was used for adult education. The building was demolished in 1997 to build the current Mother of God Monastery.
