= Bramble Park Zoo =

- Bramble Park Zoo logo

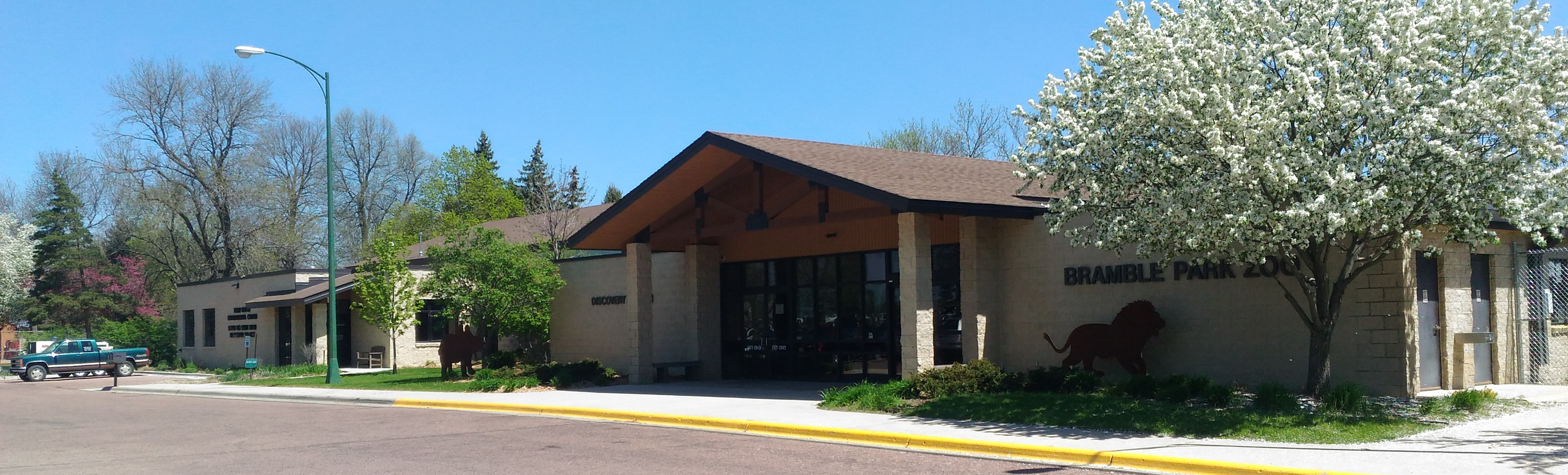
- Entrance to Bramble Park Zoo, May 2017
- Interactive map of Bramble Park Zoo
- 44.9086419°N 97.126565°W
- Date opened: 1912
- Location: Watertown, South Dakota, United States
- Land area: 15 acres (6.1 ha)
- No. of animals: 500
- No. of species: 130
- Annual visitors: 50,000
- Director: Stacy Plocher
- Website: www.brambleparkzoo.com

Bramble Park Zoo is located in Watertown, South Dakota. Open since 1912, the zoo comprises 15 acres (6.1 ha) with approximately 500 animals representing 130 different species. It is the second-largest zoo in South Dakota. The zoo is open year-round and takes extra steps to keep animals safe during South Dakota winters.

Bramble Park Zoo was an accredited member of the Association of Zoos & Aquariums (AZA) from 1993-2024. The zoo was denied reaccreditation in September 2024.

== History ==
The zoo was opened in 1912, and is named after Frank Bramble, who donated pheasants and other birds to the town to put on display. By 1940, the zoo had outgrown its original facility, and was moved to its current location. The new exhibits for the zoo were constructed by the Works Progress Administration (WPA).

In 1972, the Lake Area Zoological Society (LAZS) was created "to provide significant assistance in the growth, development and professionalism of the Zoo." The LAZS puts out a quarterly publication called animal chatter.

In the 1990s, the zoo received accreditation from the Association of Zoos and Aquariums (AZA) (1993), hired its first full-time educator (1996), and built the Discovery Center and a new front entrance to the zoo (1997). With money from the city and an Institute of Museum and Library Services (IMLS) grant, the zoo also renovated animal-holding areas and other infrastructure, constructed additional raptor rehabilitation areas, and revitalized the primate exhibits.

Throughout the first decade of the 21st century, the zoo continued to update and expand its exhibits. It created a walk-through Australian Adventure exhibit and a short grass prairie garden. In May 2010, the Terry Redlin Environmental Center opened, which includes a variety of aquariums, which were donated by Terry Redlin's son. It also includes educational activities, smaller animal exhibits, and two new educational classrooms. The new center is connected to the Discovery Center building at the entrance of the zoo.

== Animals, exhibits, and facilities ==
Jaguar Junction houses both regular phase and melanistic ("black") jaguars in a large naturalistic exhibit. It includes a pond and waterfall for the animals, and glass viewing areas for visitors.

The Bird of Prey Plaza features a raptor show with rehabilitated birds of prey.

The Children's Zoo is located near the Australian Adventure. It includes an area for goats, donkeys, and domestic rabbits.

The zoo's most famous resident was the white Bengal tiger "Tika" who died in 2012. Other large cats include snow leopards and jaguars

== Conservation ==
The zoo participates in AZA Species Survival Plans (SSP), and is active in local conservation programs.
