= Milton Coates =

American politician

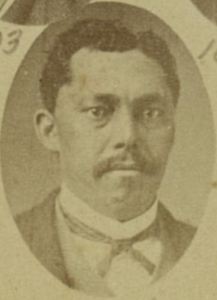

Milton Coates was a cotton weigher who served as a state legislator and post office clerk in Mississippi. He represented Warren County, Mississippi in the Mississippi House of Representatives from 1882 to 1885. A Republican, he lived on south Farmer Street in Vicksburg.

He was a defendant in a lawsuit regarding the weighing of cotton by the city of Vicksburg. His appointment as a post office clerk in Vicksburg by Henry Roberts Pease elicited objections because Coates was African American.

== See also ==
- African American officeholders from the end of the Civil War until before 1900
