= KKSD =

Radio station in Milbank, South Dakota

- Milbank, South Dakota; United States
- Broadcast area: Watertown, South Dakota
- Frequency: 104.3 MHz
- Branding: 104.3 KKSD

Programming
- Format: Classic hits
- Affiliations: Westwood One

Ownership
- Owner: Connoisseur Media; (Alpha 3E Licensee LLC)
- Sister stations: KDLO-FM; KIXX; KSDR; KSDR-FM; KWAT

History
- First air date: September 20, 1989 (as KMSD-FM)
- Former call signs: KMSD-FM (1989–1991); KPHR (1991–1998)

Technical information
- Licensing authority: FCC
- Facility ID: 63598
- Class: C1
- ERP: 100,000 watts
- HAAT: 299 meters
- Transmitter coordinates: 45°10′29.9″N 96°59′15.3″W

Links
- Public license information: Public file; LMS
- Webcast: Listen live
- Website: gowatertown.net

KKSD (104.3 FM) is a radio station broadcasting a classic hits format. Licensed to Milbank, South Dakota, United States, the station serves the Watertown area. The station is owned and operated by Connoisseur Media. programing mainly 70s 80s with some 90s

== History ==
The station was assigned the call sign KMSD-FM on September 20, 1989. On April 15, 1991, the station changed its call sign to KPHR; on May 15, 1998, it became KKSD.

KKSD ran a classic rock format as "104.3 The Fox" for many years, and flipped to its "Hippie Radio 104.3" classic hits format on January 1, 2013. The Hippie Radio branding was dropped in June 2018.

KKSD was owned and operated by Alpha Media after it purchased the stations of Digity, LLC, in 2015. Alpha Media merged with Connoisseur Media on September 4, 2025.
