= KIXX =

Radio station in Watertown, South Dakota

- Watertown, South Dakota; United States
- Broadcast area: Watertown, South Dakota
- Frequency: 96.1 MHz
- Branding: KIXX 96

Programming
- Format: Hot adult contemporary
- Affiliations: ABC News Radio

Ownership
- Owner: Connoisseur Media; (Alpha 3E License, LLC)
- Sister stations: KDLO-FM; KKSD; KSDR; KSDR-FM; KWAT

History
- First air date: September 29, 1968 (as KWAT-FM)
- Former call signs: KWAT-FM (1968–1976)
- Call sign meaning: Pronounced as kicks

Technical information
- Licensing authority: FCC
- Facility ID: 60861
- Class: C1
- ERP: 97,000 watts
- HAAT: 298 meters (978 ft)
- Transmitter coordinates: 45°10′30.8″N 96°59′16.2″W

Links
- Public license information: Public file; LMS
- Webcast: Listen live
- Website: www.gowatertown.net/stations/kixx-96/

KIXX (96.1 FM) is a radio station broadcasting a hot adult contemporary format serving the Watertown, South Dakota, United States, area. The station is owned by Connoisseur Media, through licensee Alpha 3E License, LLC.
