= Jim Marking =

Australian basketball coach

Jim Marking (April 26, 1927 – January 19, 2013) was an American professional coach, best known for his career at South Dakota State.

== Coaching career ==
=== High school coaching ===
A year after Marking graduated from Parkston High School in 1945, he was forced out of the American Navy in August, 1946 and joined South Dakota State College. Meanwhile, stationed at South Dakota College, he coached at Bruce High School and won the High School Championship in 1954. In 1957, Marking moved his success at Watertown High School and again won the High School Championship.

=== College coaching ===
He began a professional coaching career at South Dakota and continued his career for 14 years (1960 - 1974) and he won 73.8 percent in his full basketball career.

== Personal life ==
Born in Parkston, South Dakota, Marking lived in Brookings, South Dakota and is survived by his sister, five children, eight grandchildren, five-great grandchildren and his wife Carola Koehn-Marking.
