= Pelican Lake (Codington County, South Dakota) =

Lake in the state of South Dakota, United States

- Location within South Dakota Location within the United States
- Location: Codington / South Dakota
- Coordinates: 44°52′16″N 97°10′15″W
- Type: Glacial lake
- Primary inflows: Big Sioux River
- Primary outflows: Big Sioux River
- Basin countries: United States
- Surface elevation: 1,709 ft (521 m)
- Settlements: Watertown, South Dakota

Pelican Lake is a natural lake in South Dakota, in the United States. The north-east shore of the lake is part of Watertown, South Dakota.

Pelican Lake takes its name from the pelican, which is still a common migratory bird in the state.

== See also ==
- List of lakes in South Dakota
