= KWAT =

Radio station in Watertown, South Dakota

- Watertown, South Dakota; United States
- Frequency: 950 kHz
- Branding: 950 KWAT

Programming
- Format: Full-service radio
- Affiliations: Minnesota Timberwolves; Minnesota Twins

Ownership
- Owner: Connoisseur Media; (Alpha 3E Licensee LLC)
- Sister stations: KDLO-FM; KIXX; KKSD; KSDR; KSDR-FM

History
- First air date: March 8, 1940
- Call sign meaning: Watertown

Technical information
- Licensing authority: FCC
- Facility ID: 60856
- Class: B
- Power: 1,000 watts
- Transmitter coordinates: 44°52′11.9″N 97°6′50.3″W

Links
- Public license information: Public file; LMS
- Webcast: Listen live
- Website: www.gowatertown.net/stations/950-am-kwat/

KWAT (950 AM) is a radio station broadcasting a news/talk format serving the Watertown, South Dakota, area. The station is owned and operated by Connoisseur Media.

== History ==
KWAT was owned by Alpha Media after it purchased the stations of Digity, LLC, in 2015. Alpha Media merged with Connoisseur Media on September 4, 2025.
