= Watertown station =

Watertown station may refer to:

- Watertown Yard, a bus depot in Massachusetts
- Watertown Square station, a bus stop in Massachusetts
- Watertown station (South Dakota), a former train station in South Dakota
- Watertown station (Wisconsin), a former train station in Wisconsin
- Watertown Air Force Station, a former radar station in New York
