= Jake Krull =

American politician

Member of the South Dakota Senate from the 4th district
- In office 1973–1983

Personal details
- Born: December 23, 1938 Watertown, South Dakota
- Died: November 25, 2016 (aged 77) Watertown, South Dakota
- Resting place: Mount Hope Cemetery, Watertown, South Dakota
- Party: Democratic
- Spouse: Phyllis Skillman
- Children: 2
- Education: Watertown High School (1956), South Dakota State University (1960)
- Profession: Military officer (South Dakota National Guard), Insurance
- Military career
- Allegiance: United States of America
- Branch: South Dakota National Guard
- Service years: 1963-1989
- Rank: Brigadier General
- Awards: Meritorious Service Medal; Army Commendation Medal with one oak leaf cluster; National Defense Service Medal; Armed Forces Reserve Medal with hour glass (meant 20+ years before 1996)

Jacob J. "Jake" Krull Jr. (December 23, 1938 – November 25, 2016) was an American military officer and South Dakota politician. He served in the South Dakota Senate from 1973 to 1983 and was a Democrat.

== Background ==
Born in Watertown, South Dakota, Krull served in the United States Army and the South Dakota National Guard. He graduated from Watertown High School in 1956 and from South Dakota State University in 1960. He worked in the insurance business. Krull died in Watertown, South Dakota.
