= Evangelical United Brethren Church (Watertown, South Dakota) =

Historic church in South Dakota, United States

- U.S. National Register of Historic Places
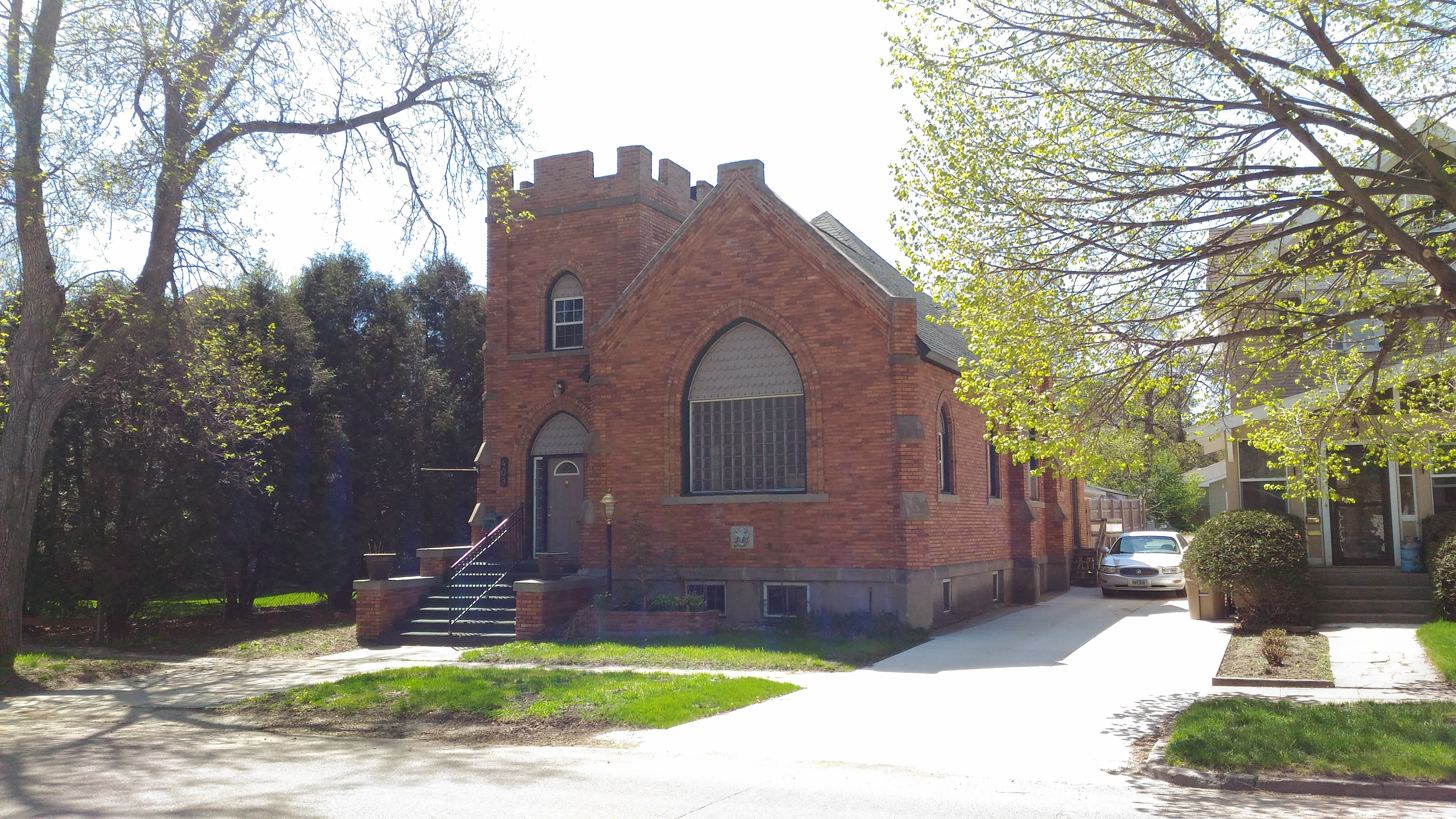
- The building in May 2017

- Location within South Dakota Location within the United States
- Location: 409 N. Maple, Watertown, South Dakota
- Coordinates: 44°54′22″N 97°6′41″W
- Area: less than one acre
- Built: 1914
- Architectural style: Late Gothic Revival
- MPS: North End Neighborhood MPS
- NRHP reference No.: 88003026
- Added to NRHP: January 3, 1989

The Evangelical United Brethren Church is a former church and a historic building at 409 N. Maple in Watertown, South Dakota. It was built in 1914, affiliated with the Church of the United Brethren in Christ until around 1946, when a merger formed the Evangelical United Brethren Church. The structure was sold in 1957 to the Seventh-day Adventists, who let the congregation share it while their new church was built at 305 9th Ave NE; then, when the same congregation built a new structure in 2002, it sold its 1957 structure to the Seventh-day Adventists as well. It is now a private residence.

The building was added to the National Register in 1989..Com

Its most salient feature is a castellated two-story tower. It has decorative brick and concrete false buttresses.
