= Watertown, South Dakota =

- City
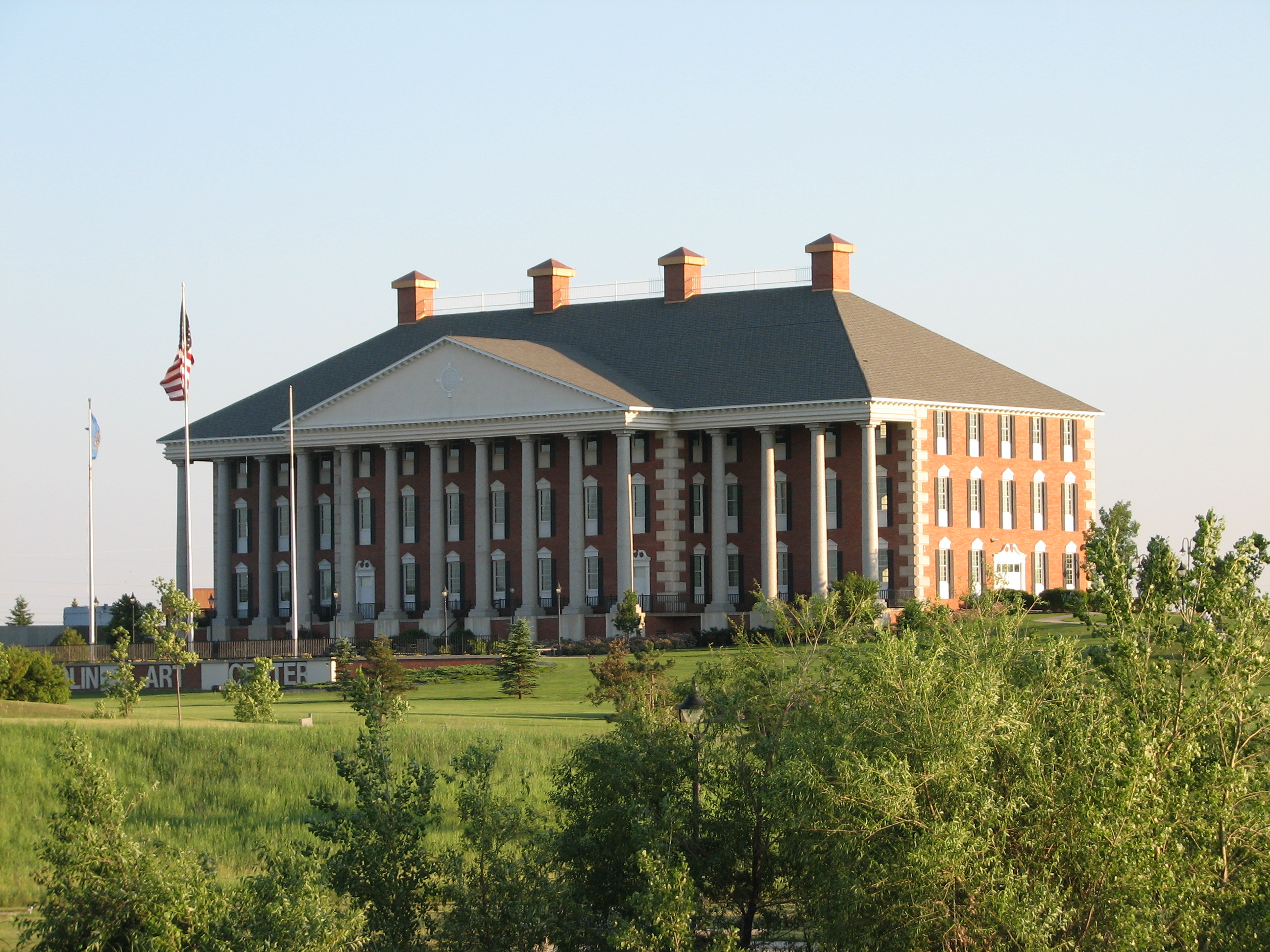
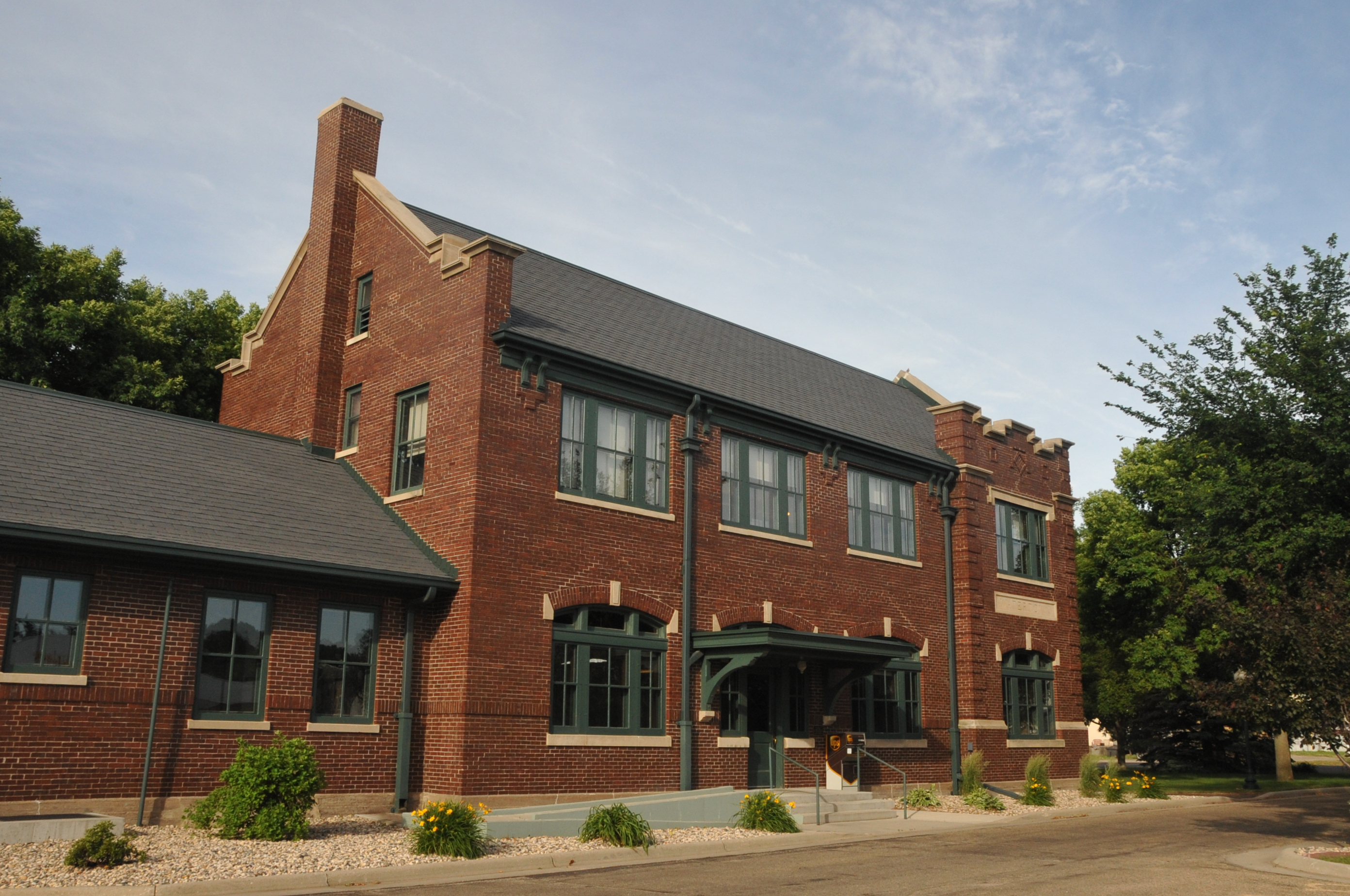
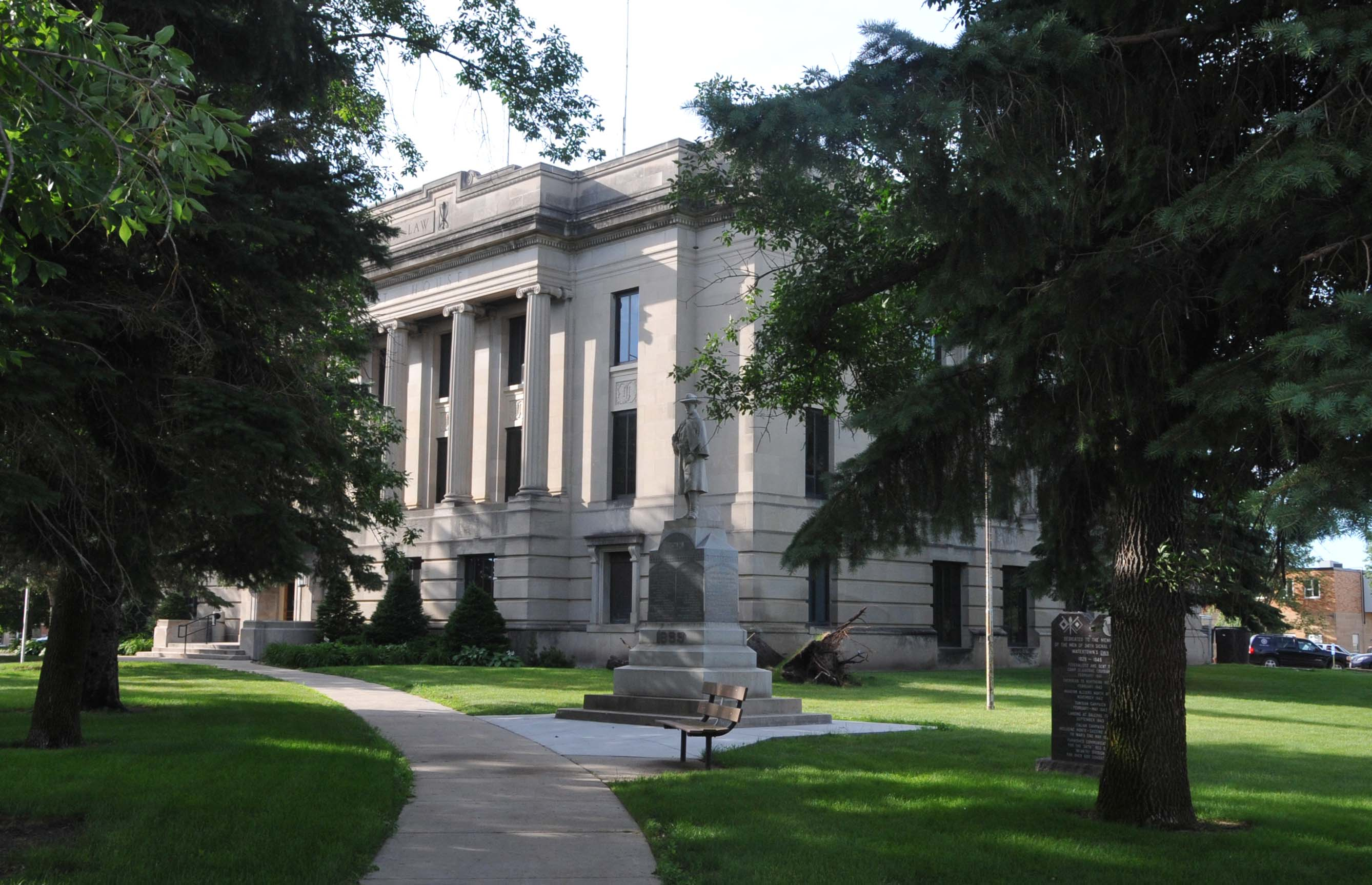
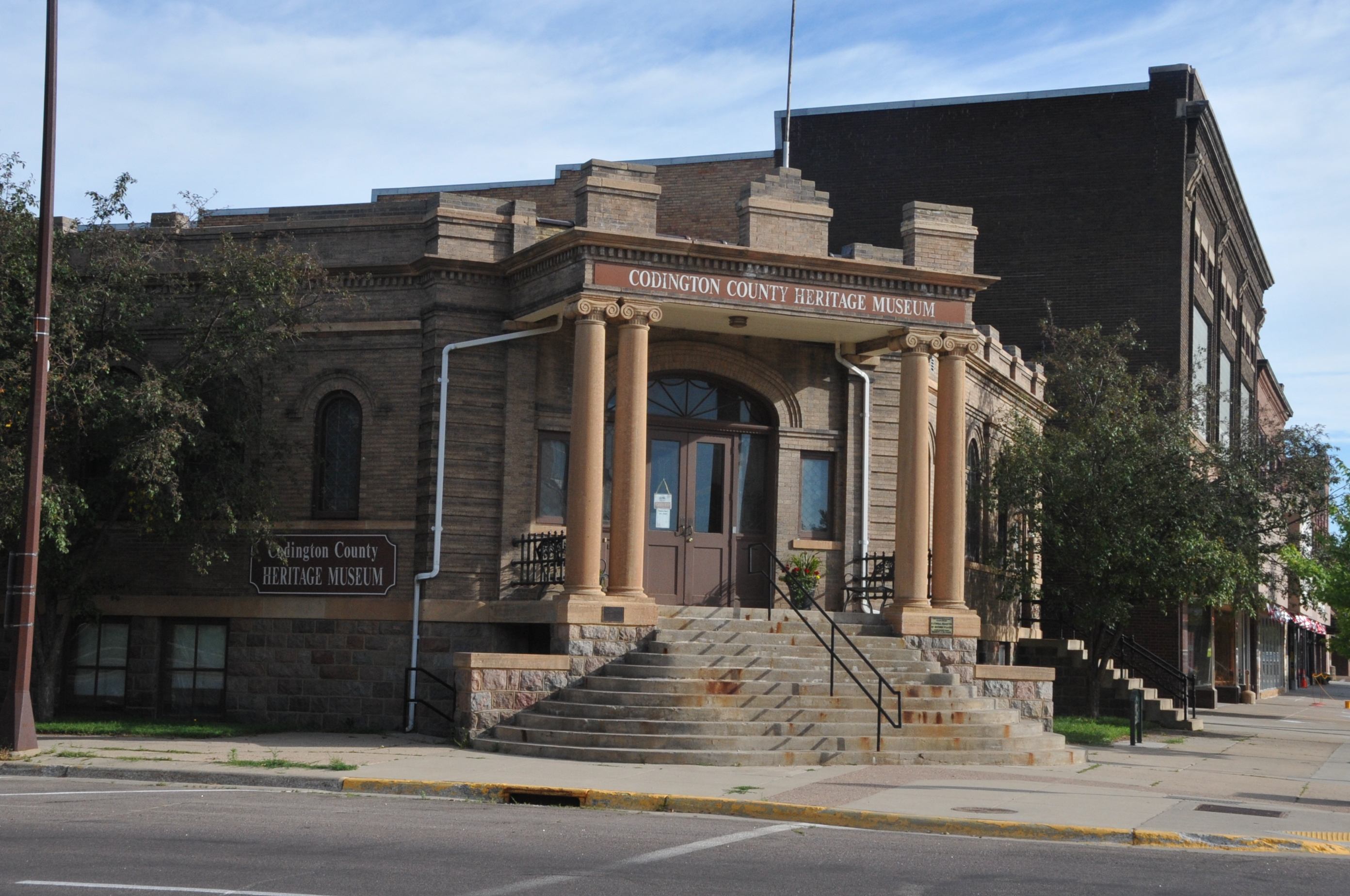
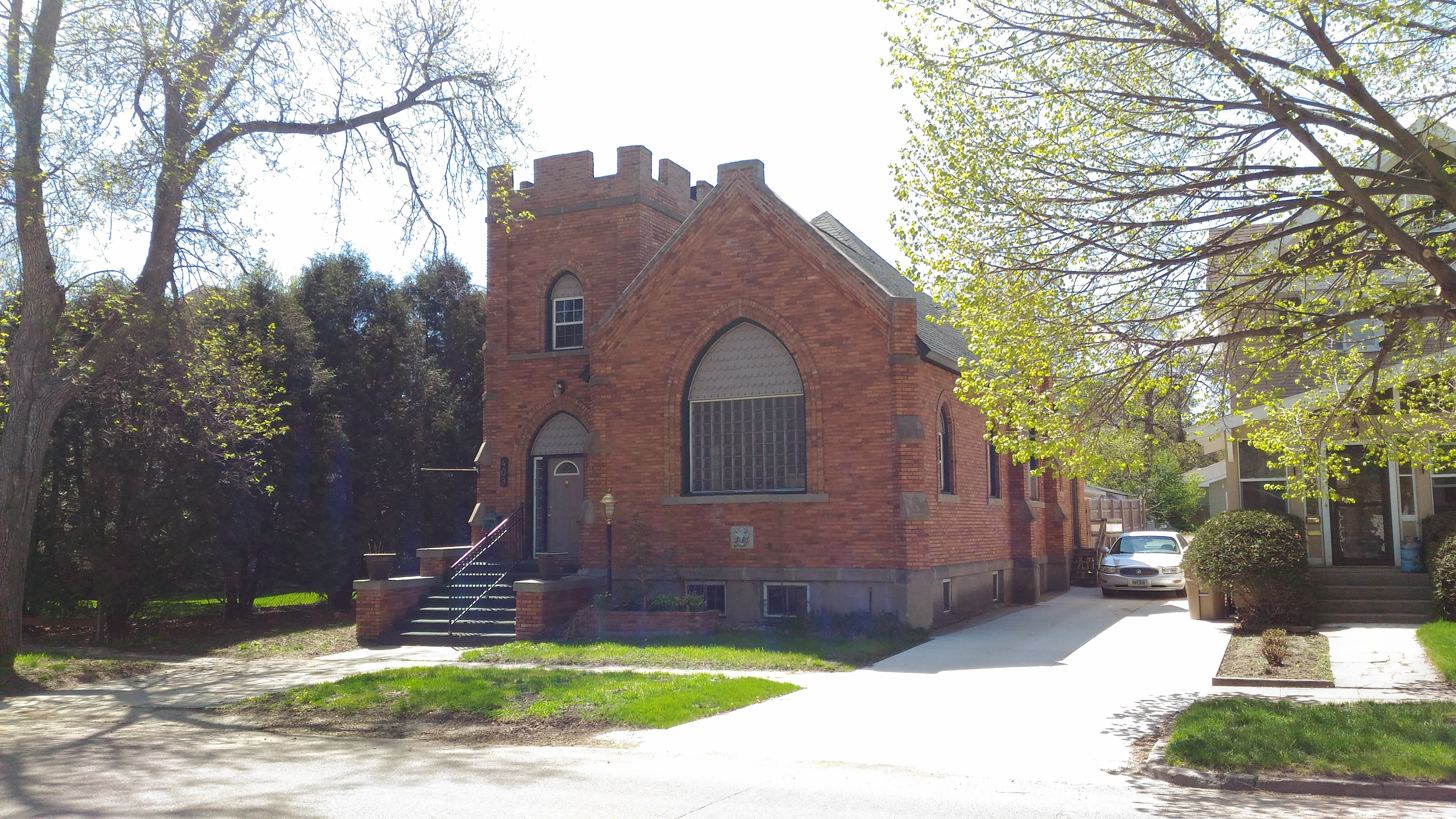
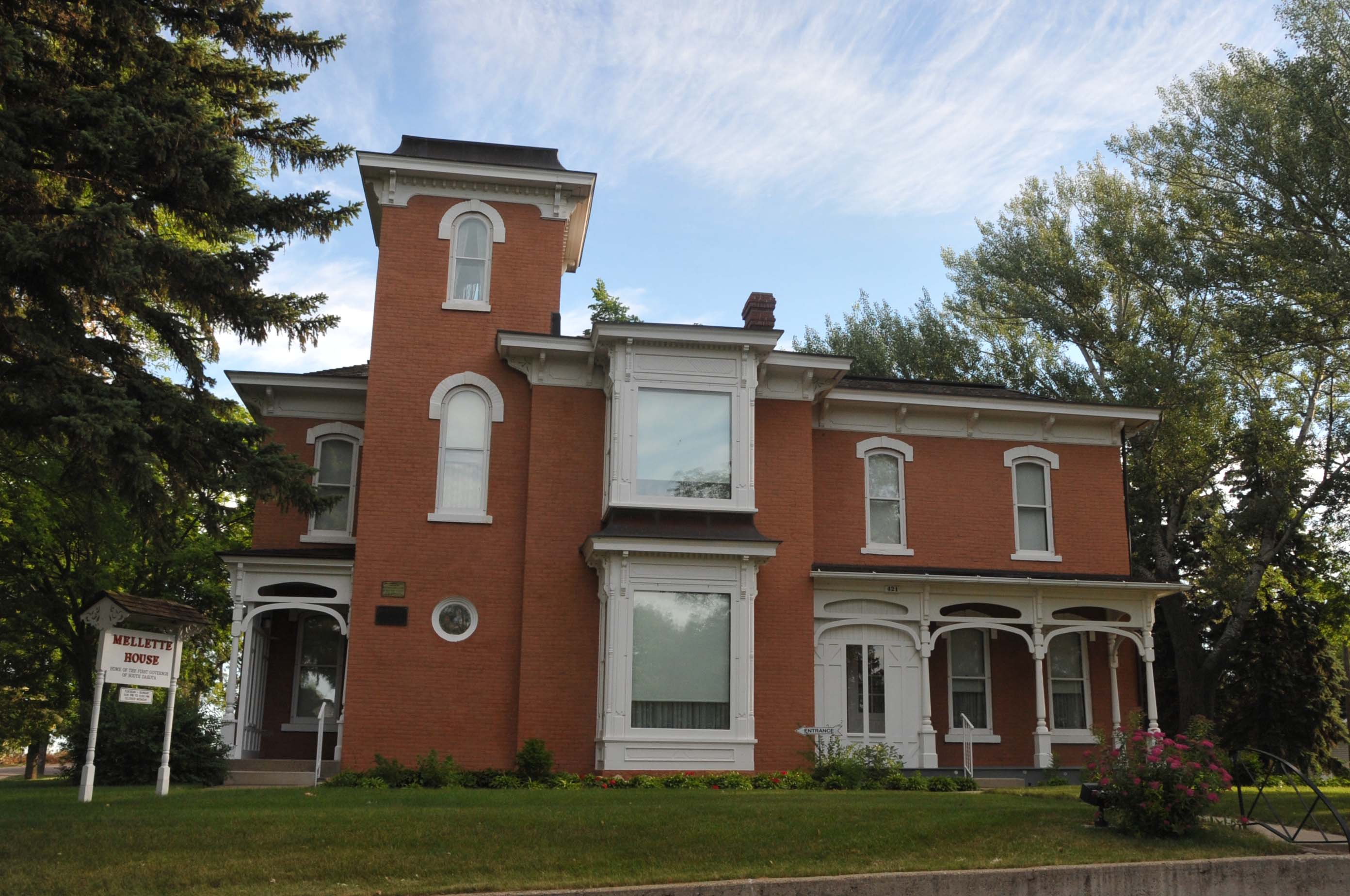
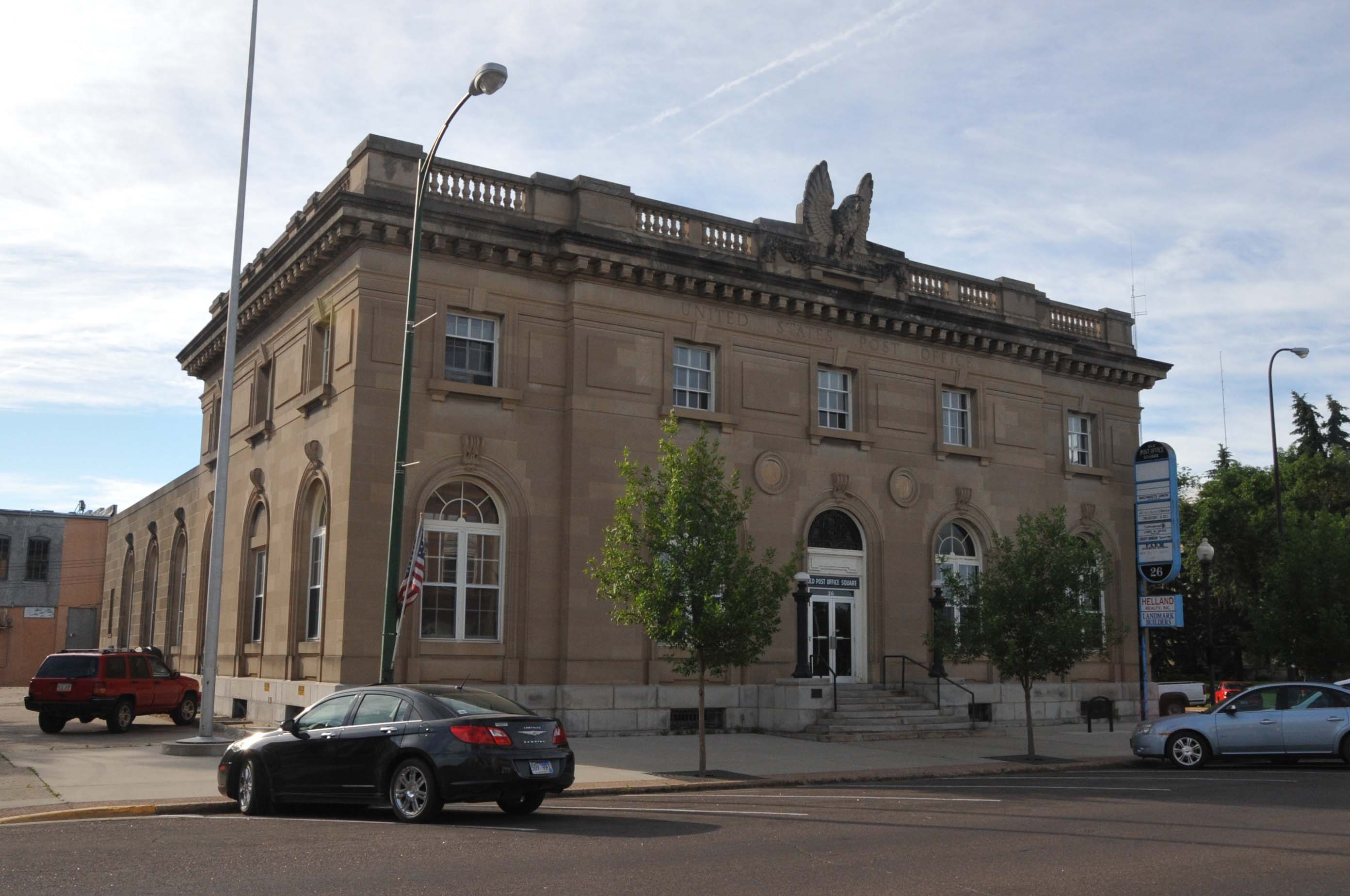
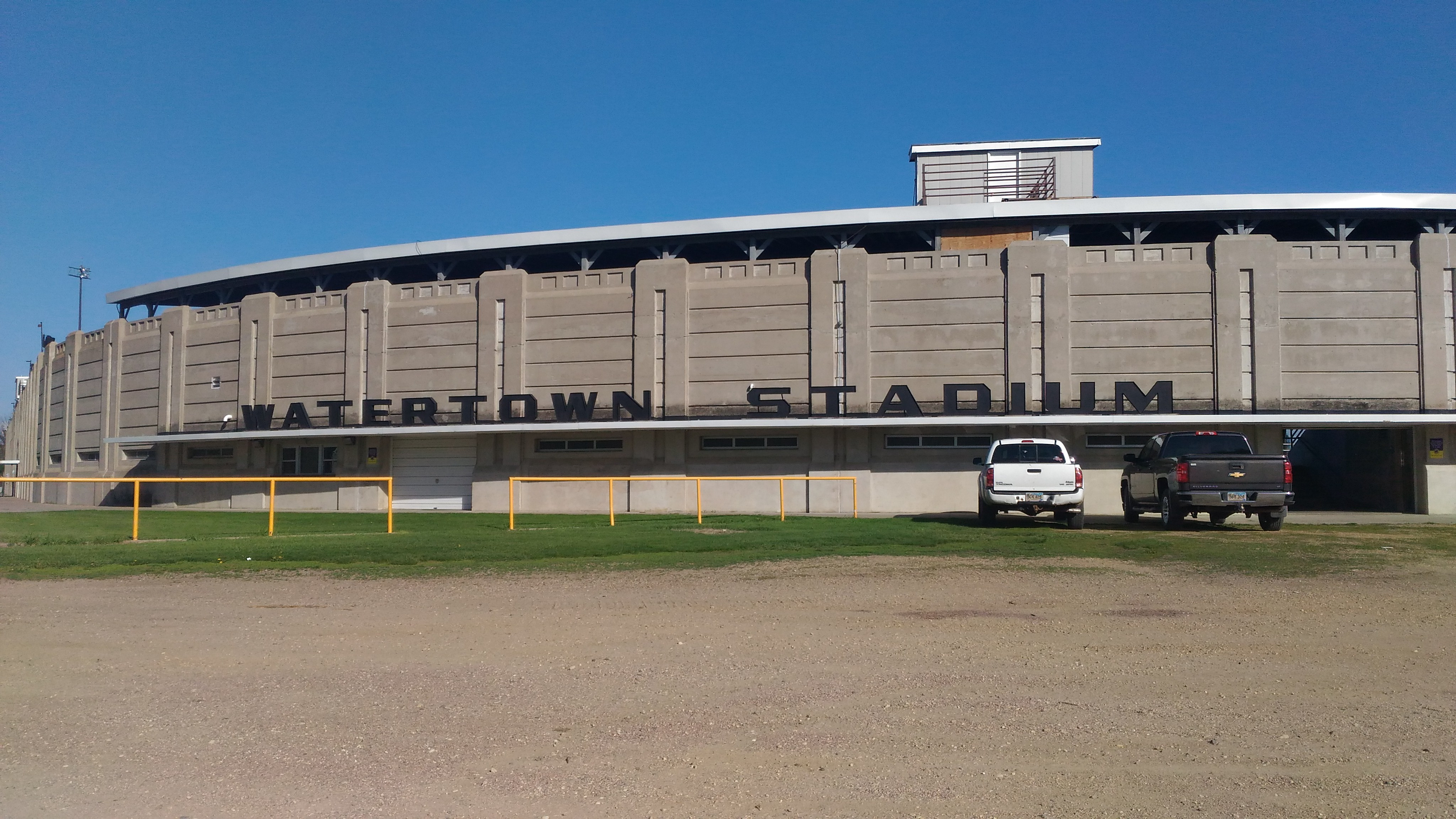
- Redlin Art Center Watertown station Codington County Courthouse Codington County Heritage Museum Evangelical United Brethren Church Mellette House Old Post Office Watertown Stadium Allen Mitchell Athletic Complex

- Seal Logo
- Nickname: South Dakota's Rising Star
- Location in Codington County and the state of South Dakota
- Coordinates: 44°54′12″N 97°7′14″W
- Country: United States
- State: South Dakota
- County: Codington
- Founded: 1879
- Incorporated: 1885

Government
  - Type: Mayor–council
  - Body: Watertown City Council
  - Mayor: Ried Holien

Area
  - City: 26.34 sq mi (68.23 km^{2})
  - Land: 18.37 sq mi (47.57 km^{2})
  - Water: 7.98 sq mi (20.66 km^{2})
- Elevation: 1,729 ft (527 m)

Population (2020)
  - City: 22,655
  - Estimate (2024): 23,501
  - Density: 1,233.5/sq mi (476.25/km^{2})
  - Metro: 37,330 (US: 451st)
- Time zone: UTC-6 (CST)
  - Summer (DST): UTC-5 (CDT)
- ZIP code: 57201
- Area code: 605
- FIPS code: 46-69300
- GNIS feature ID: 1267627
- Website: watertownsd.us

Watertown is a city in and the county seat of Codington County, South Dakota, United States. Watertown is home to the Redlin Art Center, which houses many of the works of wildlife artist Terry Redlin. Watertown is between Pelican Lake and Lake Kampeska, from which Redlin derived inspiration for his artwork.

The population was 22,655 at the 2020 census, making Watertown South Dakota's 5th-most populous city. It is also the principal city of the Watertown Micropolitan Statistical Area, which includes all of Codington County. It is home to the Bramble Park Zoo. Watertown's residential real estate is considered the most expensive in South Dakota for cities of its size; the median price for a home in Watertown was approximately $200,000 as of 2013.

== Geography ==
Watertown is along the Big Sioux River.

According to the United States Census Bureau, the city has an area of 25.04 square miles (64.85 km^{2}), of which 17.45 square miles (45.20 km^{2}) is land and 7.59 square miles (19.66 km^{2}) is water. Watertown sits on the Big Sioux River and two major lakes, Pelican Lake and Lake Kampeska. Most of Watertown also sits on a short plateau. Watertown Regional Airport's elevation is 1,745 ft (532 m).

== History ==
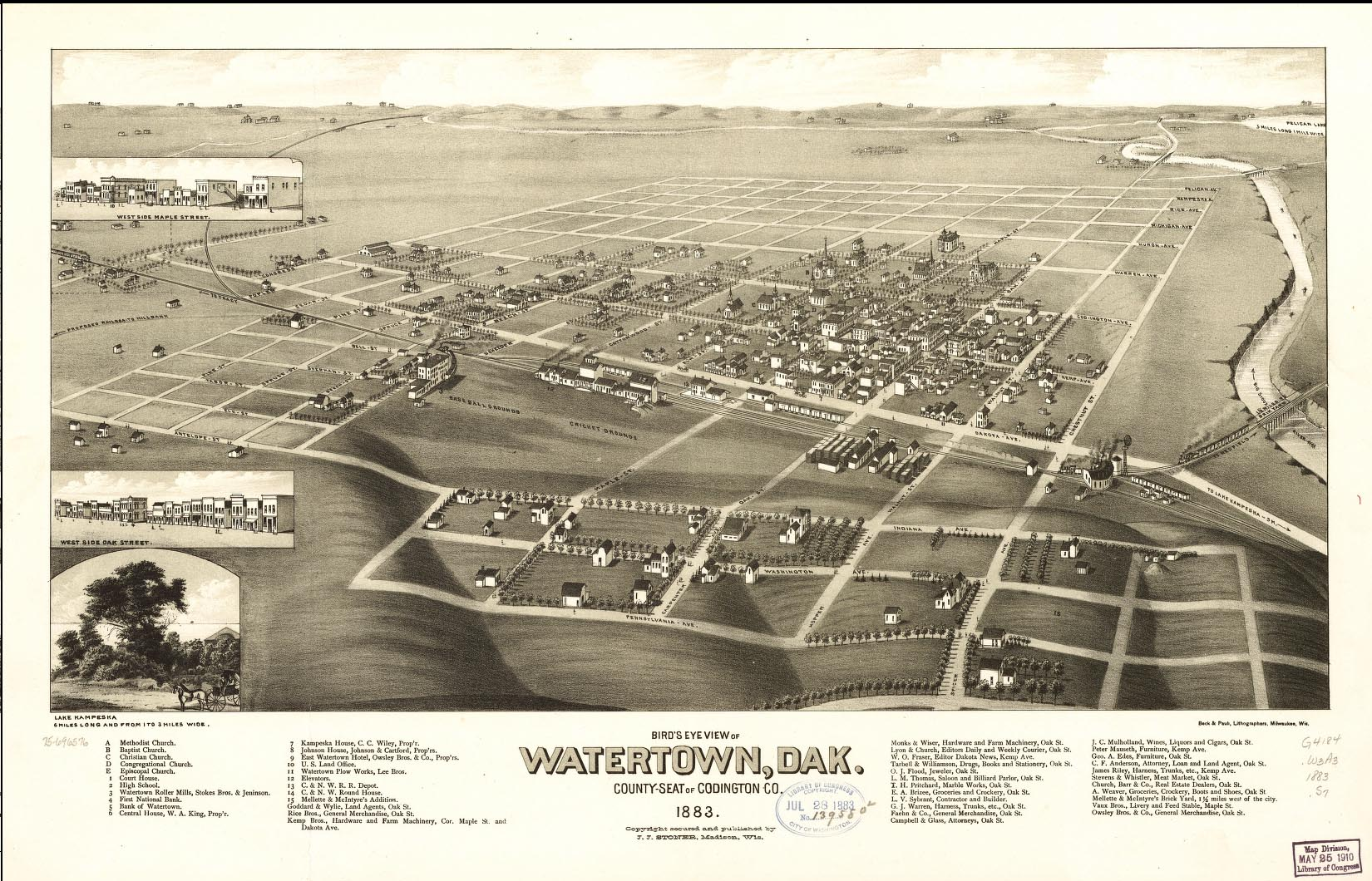
An 1883 bird's eye illustration of Watertown

Watertown was founded in 1879 as a rail terminus when the Chicago & Northwestern Railroad reactivated part of a line it had constructed to Lake Kampeska. The city was named after Watertown, New York, the hometown of brothers John E. and Oscar P. Kemp (grandfather of Jack Kemp), two of the city's founders. The town was originally planned to be called Kampeska.

During the 1880s, Watertown prospered as a transportation hub after the railroads had extended farther west. Along with several other cities, it had been a candidate for capital of the new state of South Dakota, losing to the more centrally located Pierre. The city's newspaper, the Watertown Public Opinion, began publishing in 1887.

In the mid-20th century, Interstate 29 was constructed through eastern South Dakota. The route included a slight bend to bring it closer to Watertown. Its construction was a major economic benefit to Watertown and the communities near it.

== Climate ==
In the last decades the climate is configured as hot-summer humid continental climate (Köppen: Dfa); it previously had a warm-summer (Dfb). Although it is a humid city, it is relatively dry for its climatic category, due to its position in the Great Plains, which still provides an even greater thermal amplitude, especially in the higher values.

Climate data for Watertown Regional Airport, South Dakota (1991−2020 normals, extremes 1893−present)
Month	Jan	Feb	Mar	Apr	May	Jun	Jul	Aug	Sep	Oct	Nov	Dec	Year
Record high °F (°C)	65 (18)	66 (19)	82 (28)	95 (35)	106 (41)	107 (42)	110 (43)	105 (41)	104 (40)	91 (33)	78 (26)	69 (21)	110 (43)
Mean maximum °F (°C)	41.7 (5.4)	46.0 (7.8)	63.1 (17.3)	78.6 (25.9)	86.3 (30.2)	90.8 (32.7)	93.4 (34.1)	91.3 (32.9)	87.7 (30.9)	79.0 (26.1)	62.2 (16.8)	44.8 (7.1)	95.0 (35.0)
Mean daily maximum °F (°C)	21.4 (−5.9)	25.9 (−3.4)	38.6 (3.7)	54.0 (12.2)	66.9 (19.4)	76.8 (24.9)	82.0 (27.8)	79.5 (26.4)	71.6 (22.0)	56.2 (13.4)	39.8 (4.3)	26.3 (−3.2)	53.2 (11.8)
Daily mean °F (°C)	12.2 (−11.0)	16.3 (−8.7)	29.1 (−1.6)	42.8 (6.0)	55.7 (13.2)	66.1 (18.9)	71.0 (21.7)	68.5 (20.3)	60.1 (15.6)	45.7 (7.6)	30.6 (−0.8)	17.8 (−7.9)	43.0 (6.1)
Mean daily minimum °F (°C)	3.1 (−16.1)	6.7 (−14.1)	19.6 (−6.9)	31.5 (−0.3)	44.5 (6.9)	55.4 (13.0)	60.0 (15.6)	57.5 (14.2)	48.6 (9.2)	35.2 (1.8)	21.3 (−5.9)	9.3 (−12.6)	32.7 (0.4)
Mean minimum °F (°C)	−20.9 (−29.4)	−17.2 (−27.3)	−6.0 (−21.1)	15.1 (−9.4)	29.4 (−1.4)	42.9 (6.1)	47.3 (8.5)	44.6 (7.0)	32.1 (0.1)	18.4 (−7.6)	2.3 (−16.5)	−13.8 (−25.4)	−24.3 (−31.3)
Record low °F (°C)	−40 (−40)	−38 (−39)	−27 (−33)	−10 (−23)	16 (−9)	25 (−4)	35 (2)	32 (0)	9 (−13)	−2 (−19)	−20 (−29)	−37 (−38)	−40 (−40)
Average precipitation inches (mm)	0.58 (15)	0.65 (17)	1.00 (25)	2.06 (52)	2.87 (73)	3.85 (98)	3.05 (77)	2.89 (73)	2.45 (62)	1.95 (50)	0.68 (17)	0.68 (17)	22.71 (577)
Average snowfall inches (cm)	6.7 (17)	8.9 (23)	5.4 (14)	5.2 (13)	0.1 (0.25)	0.0 (0.0)	0.0 (0.0)	0.0 (0.0)	0.0 (0.0)	1.4 (3.6)	4.5 (11)	8.9 (23)	41.1 (104)
Average precipitation days (≥ 0.01 in)	5.9	6.0	6.9	8.9	11.4	11.4	9.5	8.6	8.5	7.5	5.4	6.3	96.3
Average snowy days (≥ 0.1 in)	5.6	5.9	3.5	1.9	0.0	0.0	0.0	0.0	0.0	1.1	2.6	6.0	26.6
Source: NOAA

== Demographics ==
Historical population
Census	Pop.	Note	%±
1880	746		—
1890	2,672		258.2%
1900	3,352		25.4%
1910	7,010		109.1%
1920	9,400		34.1%
1930	10,214		8.7%
1940	10,617		3.9%
1950	12,699		19.6%
1960	14,077		10.9%
1970	13,388		−4.9%
1980	15,649		16.9%
1990	17,592		12.4%
2000	20,237		15.0%
2010	21,482		6.2%
2020	22,655		5.5%
2022 (est.)	23,019		1.6%
U.S. Decennial Census; 2020 Census

The per capita income for the city was $18,994. About 5.7% of families and 9.3% of the population were below the poverty line, including 8.5% of those under age 18 and 11.0% of those age 65 or over.

=== 2020 census ===
As of the 2020 census, Watertown had a population of 22,655. The median age was 38.1 years. 22.9% of residents were under the age of 18 and 18.6% of residents were 65 years of age or older. For every 100 females there were 99.6 males, and for every 100 females age 18 and over there were 99.7 males age 18 and over.

90.9% of residents lived in urban areas, while 9.1% lived in rural areas.

There were 9,899 households in Watertown, of which 26.5% had children under the age of 18 living in them. Of all households, 41.9% were married-couple households, 23.2% were households with a male householder and no spouse or partner present, and 27.0% were households with a female householder and no spouse or partner present. About 35.6% of all households were made up of individuals and 13.9% had someone living alone who was 65 years of age or older.

There were 10,878 housing units, of which 9.0% were vacant. The homeowner vacancy rate was 1.6% and the rental vacancy rate was 10.6%.

Racial composition as of the 2020 census
Race	Number	Percent
White	20,702	91.4%
Black or African American	105	0.5%
American Indian and Alaska Native	617	2.7%
Asian	181	0.8%
Native Hawaiian and Other Pacific Islander	7	0.0%
Some other race	197	0.9%
Two or more races	846	3.7%
Hispanic or Latino (of any race)	627	2.8%

=== 2010 census ===
As of the census of 2010, there were 21,482 people, 9,278 households, and 5,563 families residing in the city. The population density was 1,231.3 inhabitants per square mile (475.4/km^{2}). There were 10,050 housing units at an average density of 575.9 per square mile (222.4/km^{2}). The racial makeup of the city was 94.8% White, 0.4% African American, 2.4% Native American, 0.5% Asian, 0.5% from other races, and 1.4% from two or more races. Hispanic or Latino of any race were 1.6% of the population.

There were 9,278 households, of which 29.6% had children under the age of 18 living with them, 45.7% were married couples living together, 10.0% had a female householder with no husband present, 4.3% had a male householder with no wife present, and 40.0% were non-families. 33.0% of all households were made up of individuals, and 12.4% had someone living alone who was 65 years of age or older. The average household size was 2.28 and the average family size was 2.90.

The median age in the city was 36.6 years. 24.2% of residents were under the age of 18; 10.3% were between the ages of 18 and 24; 24.9% were from 25 to 44; 25.2% were from 45 to 64; and 15.4% were 65 years of age or older. The gender makeup of the city was 49.2% male and 50.8% female.

=== 2000 census ===
As of the census of 2000, there were 20,237 people, 8,385 households, and 5,290 families residing in the city. The population density was 1,328.9 inhabitants per square mile (513.1/km^{2}). There were 9,193 housing units at an average density of 603.7 per square mile (233.1/km^{2}). The racial makeup of the city was 96.25% White, 0.14% African American, 1.65% Native American, 0.33% Asian, 0.02% Pacific Islander, 0.71% from other races, and 0.90% from two or more races. Hispanic or Latino of any race were 1.28% of the population. 47.1% were of German, 19.8% Norwegian and 5.9% Irish ancestry. 96.5% spoke English, 1.7% Spanish and 1.1% German as their first language.

There were 8,385 households, out of which 31.9% had children under the age of 18 living with them, 50.6% were married couples living together, 8.8% had a female householder with no husband present, and 36.9% were non-families. 30.5% of all households were made up of individuals, and 11.8% had someone living alone who was 65 years of age or older. The average household size was 2.37 and the average family size was 2.98.

In the city, the population was spread out, with 25.9% under the age of 18, 11.3% from 18 to 24, 27.9% from 25 to 44, 19.9% from 45 to 64, and 15.0% who were 65 years of age or older. The median age was 35 years. For every 100 females, there were 96.6 males. For every 100 females age 18 and over, there were 93.9 males.

== Education ==
Watertown has two institutions providing post-secondary education. Lake Area Technical College is a public technical school classified as a community college, offering degrees in areas such as agriculture, nursing, and welding. There is also a satellite campus of Mount Marty University, a private Catholic school based in Yankton, South Dakota.

Lake Area Technical College received the 2017 Aspen Prize for Community College Excellence, following three previous Finalist-With-Distinction honors in 2011, 2013, and 2015. The Aspen Institute awarded the prize in March 2017 in Washington, D.C., after an intense data collection process that included a rigorous review of critical elements of student success, such as learning, completion, and employment after college.

The school district is Watertown School District 14-4.. Watertown has one public high school, Watertown High School, and Watertown Middle School (7th and 8th grades) is Watertown's only public middle school. Construction of the school was completed in 2015. The community's "Prairie Lakes Wellness Center" opened in 2017, adjacent to the middle school. When the middle school opened in 2015, the former middle school was renovated and became the Intermediate School (5th and 6th grades). Watertown has multiple elementary schools. The five public elementary schools are Lincoln Elementary, Jefferson Elementary, Roosevelt Elementary, McKinnely Elementary, and Mellette Elementary.

There are also private schools: There is one private boarding school, Great Plains Lutheran High School, of the Wisconsin Evangelical Lutheran Synod. Immaculate Conception School is a private Catholic elementary school. St. Martin's Lutheran School is a private Lutheran elementary school of the WELS. Watertown Christian School is a private non-denominational Christian elementary school. Harmony Hill High School was a Catholic girls' boarding school in Watertown from 1967 to 1974.

The Watertown Regional Library is the town's main library. It is on 6th St. NE and open every day of the week.

== Points of interest ==
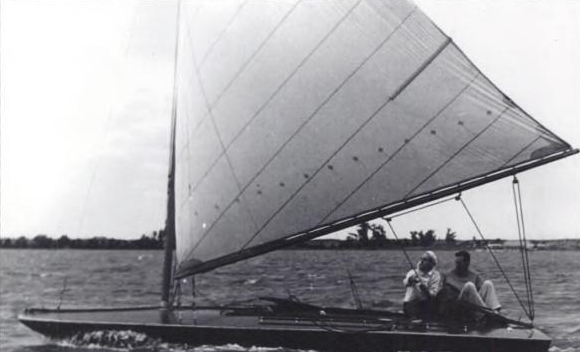
Sailboat on Lake Kampeska circa 1900.

- Redlin Art Center
- Bramble Park Zoo
- Codington County Heritage Museum
- Mellette House
- Watertown Family Aquatic Center
- Watertown Stadium
- Lake Kampeska
- Pelican Lake
- Watertown Regional Library
- The Goss Opera House

== Local media ==
- Newspaper
  - The Watertown Public Opinion, a daily newspaper.
  - The Watertown Current, a weekly publication.

=== Television ===
Channel (Digital)	Callsign	Network	Owner
3.1	KDLO-DT (Satellite of KELO)	CBS	Nexstar Media Group
3.2	KDLO-DT (Satellite of KELO)	MyNetworkTV	Nexstar Media Group
3.4	KDLO-DT (Satellite of KELO)	The CW Plus	Nexstar Media Group
13.1	K32DK-D (Translator of KSFY)	ABC	Gray Television
13.2	K32DK-D (Translator of KSFY)	Outlaw	Gray Television
13.3	K32DK-D (Translator of KSFY)	MeTV	Gray Television
13.4	K32DK-D (Translator of KSFY)	True Crime Network	Gray Television
13.5	K32DK-D (Translator of KSFY)	TheGrio	Gray Television
46.1	K28OE-D (Translator of KDLT)	NBC	Gray Television
46.2	K28OE-D (Translator of KDLT)	FOX	Gray Television
46.3	K28OE-D (Translator of KDLT)	365BLK	Gray Television
46.4	K28OE-D (Translator of KDLT)	Cozi TV	Gray Television
46.5	K28OE-D (Translator of KDLT)	Court TV	Gray Television
46.6	K28OE-D (Translator of KDLT)	Ion Mystery	Gray Television

=== AM radio ===
AM radio stations
Frequency	Call sign	Name	Format	Owner	City
950 AM	KWAT		Full-service radio	Connoisseur Media	Watertown
1480 AM	KSDR	The Talk of Watertown	Conservative talk radio	Connoisseur Media	Watertown

=== FM radio ===
FM radio stations
Frequency	Call sign	Name	Format	Owner	Target city/market	City of license
89.1 FM	KPGT		Religious	Church Planters of America	Watertown	Watertown
90.1 FM	K211EC		Christian; WJFM-FM translator	Jimmy Swaggart Ministries	Watertown	Watertown
90.3 FM	KJSD	South Dakota Public Broadcasting	NPR	South Dakota Bureau of Information and Telecommunication	Watertown	Watertown
91.9 FM	K220IT	KNWC-FM	Contemporary Christian	University of Northwestern - St. Paul	Watertown	Watertown
92.9 FM	KSDR-FM	New Country KS93	Hot Country	Connoisseur Media	Watertown	Watertown
96.1 FM	KIXX	The Best Mix Kicks 96	Hot AC	Connoisseur Media	Watertown	Watertown
96.9 FM	KDLO-FM	96.9 KDLO Country	Classic Country	Connoisseur Media	Watertown	Watertown
98.1 FM	KPHR	Star 98.1	Soft Adult Contemporary	Prairie Winds Broadcasting	Watertown	Ortonville
99.1 FM	KXLG		Soft Adult Contemporary, News/Talk	TMRG Broadcasting, LLC	Watertown	Milbank
103.5 FM	K278BK		Christian Radio	VCY America	Watertown	Watertown
104.3 FM	KKSD	104.3 KKSD	Classic Hits	Connoisseur Media	Watertown	Milbank
106.3 FM	KPHR	Power 106.3	Classic Rock	Prairie Winds Broadcasting	Watertown	Ortonville

== Transportation ==
- Interstate 29 serves Watertown at Exits 177 and 180
- U.S. Highway 81
- U.S. Highway 212
- South Dakota Highway 20
- 20th Avenue South, 20th Avenue Southeast, and 29th Street Southeast: alternate city truck route around Watertown's south side
- 448th Avenue and North Lake Drive: former South Dakota Highway 139; runs along Lake Kampeska's west side

Watertown also has one airport, Watertown Regional Airport, served by Denver Air Connection with flights to Denver and Chicago O'Hare, and local bus service provided by the Watertown Area Transit Corporation.

Jefferson Lines provides intercity bus service to Watertown.

== Notable people ==
- Cleveland Abbott (Tuskegee Institute), Hall of Fame coach and educator
- Sylvia Bacon (born 1931), Judge of the Superior Court, District of Columbia
- Nancy Turbak Berry (born 1956), trial attorney and South Dakota state senator
- Stephen Foster Briggs (1885–1976), founder of the Briggs & Stratton Corporation
- John Hamre (born 1950), Deputy Secretary of Defense and international studies specialist
- Fred H. Hildebrandt (1874–1956), U.S. Representative from South Dakota
- Wendell "Bud" Hurlbut (1918–2011), amusement park designer
- J. A. Jance (born 1944), writer
- Charles B. Kornmann (born 1937), federal judge on United States District Court for the District of South Dakota
- Jake Krull (1938–2016), Army Brigadier General, SD National Guard; South Dakota state senator
- George R. Mather, general in the U.S. Army, Commander in Chief, United States Southern Command (USCINCSO) from 1969 to 1971
- Arthur C. Mellette (1842–1896), last Dakota territorial governor and first governor of South Dakota
- Kristi Noem (born 1971), governor of South Dakota and former Secretary of Homeland Security
- Hope A. Olson, author and information studies professor
- Henry Roberts Pease (1837–1907), Civil War veteran and U.S. senator from Mississippi
- Lee Raymond (born 1938), chemical engineer and longtime chairman and CEO of Exxon Corporation and ExxonMobil, born and attended primary and secondary school in Watertown
- Terry Redlin (1937–2016), wildlife artist whose work is displayed at Redlin Art Center
- Bob Scholtz (born 1937), football player
- Joseph Schull (1906–1980), Canadian playwright and historian
- Ramona Solberg (1921-2005), jeweler
- Lee Schoenbeck (born 1958), lawyer and current president pro tempore of the State Senate
- Neal Tapio (born 1970), businessman and former Trump presidential campaign director for South Dakota
- Timmy Williams (born 1981), comedian (The Whitest Kids U' Know)
- Roger Zwieg (1942–2015), NASA test pilot and flight instructor

== Major employers ==
According to the city's 2018 Comprehensive Annual Financial Report, Watertown's largest employers are:

Employer	Sector	Number of Employees	As of	Notes
Watertown School District	Education	776	June 2018	
Prairie Lakes Health System	Healthcare	683	June 2018	
Terex Utilities	Manufacturing	634	June 2018	
Hy-Vee	Retail	450	June 2018	Mostly part-time
Premier Bankcard	Lending	367	June 2018	
City of Watertown	Government	336	June 2018	
Worthington Industries	Manufacturing	309	June 2018	
Walmart	Retail	300	July 2017	
Dakota Bodies	Manufacturing	285	June 2018	
Jenkins Living Center	Healthcare	274	June 2018	
OEM Worldwide/Sparton	Manufacturing	272	May 2017	
Spartronics	Manufacturing	253	June 2018	
Dakota Sioux Casino	Entertainment	215	November 2016	
Lake Area Technical College	Education	211	May 2017	
Target	Retail	85	July 2017	
