= Lake Area Technical College =

Community college in Watertown, South Dakota

Coordinates: 44.901127°N 97.095269°W

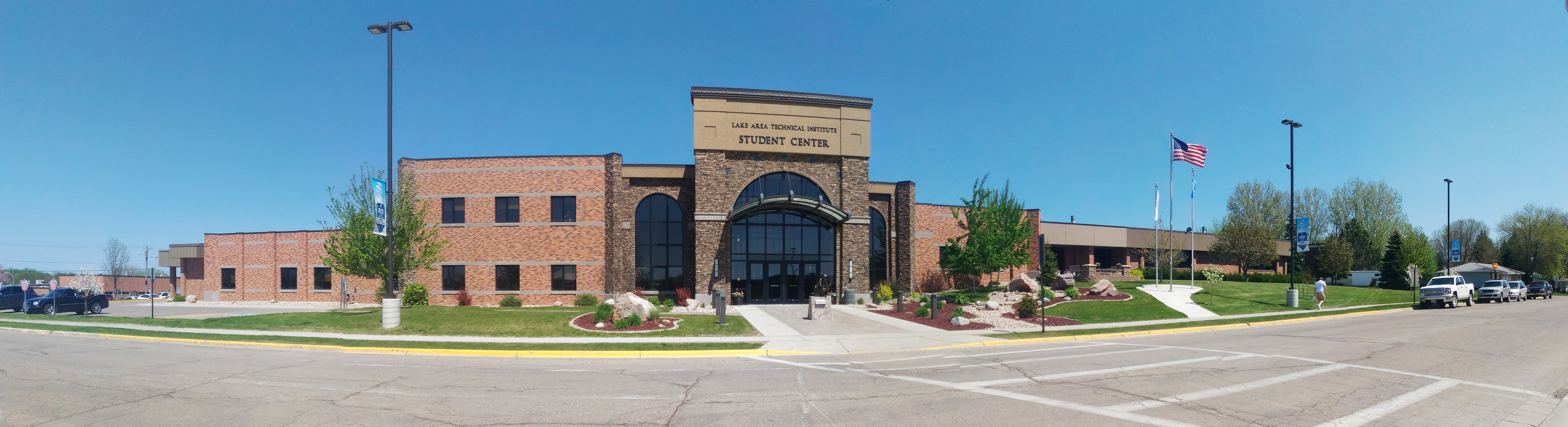
- LATI Student Center
- Motto: It's Your World
- Type: Public community college
- Established: 1965; 61 years ago
- Academic affiliations: Space-grant
- President: Tiffany Sanderson
- Undergraduates: 2190
- Location: Watertown, South Dakota, United States
- Campus: Rural
- Website: www.lakeareatech.edu
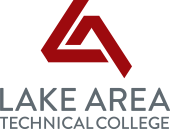

Lake Area Technical College (Lake Area Tech or LATC, formerly Lake Area Technical Institute (LATI)) is a public community college in Watertown, South Dakota. The campus covers 40 acres and serves an area of 18,000 square miles. Founded in 1965, Lake Area Tech was the first technical school to be established in South Dakota, followed by schools in Mitchell, Sioux Falls and Rapid City. Lake Area Tech is accredited by the Higher Learning Commission.

== Campus ==
Due to the increasing number of students, the school completed a four-phase campus expansion project in 2013. The project included a new Diesel, Energy, and Welding facility, a new Automotive and Health Science Facility, a centralized Student Center, and a new Agriculture facility. To continue to manage the increase in student population, Lake Area Tech completed a flex space 'The Lab' in 2018 and has constructed a new facility on campus that houses all of the healthcare programs. The new Prairie Lakes Healthcare Center of Learning opened Fall 2020.

The Ace A. Brandt Diesel Center was opened in Fall 2023, in dedication to Brandt. Brandt was the founder of Brandt Holdings, and died of brain cancer in 2021. The new building includes lab space, classrooms, and a wash bay for diesel equipment.

The school is anticipating a 10 year master campus plan aimed for 2035. The independent phased projects include replacing a cold storage unit, creating program hubs, a public safety training center, a construction trades center, and enhancing campus safety & security.

== Academics ==
Lake Area Tech has more than 30 programs of study, including 15 online degrees, and serves more than 2,600 full-time, part-time, and online students. Some of the school's long-standing programs include Agriculture, Welding, Cosmetology, Diesel, Aviation, and Nursing.

== Students ==
Student Body Composition: Fall 2023
Race and Ethnicity
White	91%
Hispanic	3%
American Indian/Alaska Native	3%
Black	1%
Asian	1%
Non-resident alien	0.5%
Two or more races	0%
Unknown	1%
Federal Student Aid Breakdown
Students receiving Pell Grants	34%
Students not receiving Pell Grants	66%
National Center for Education Statistics

=== Reputation and rankings ===
In March 2017, Lake Area Tech was named the winner of the 2017 Aspen Prize for Community College Excellence, following three previous Finalist-With-Distinction honors in 2011, 2013, and 2015. The prize was awarded by the Aspen Institute in March 2017.
