= KSDR (AM) =

Radio station in Watertown, South Dakota

- Watertown, South Dakota; United States
- Frequency: 1480 kHz

Programming
- Format: News/talk

Ownership
- Owner: Connoisseur Media; (Alpha 3E Licensee LLC)
- Sister stations: KDLO-FM; KIXX; KKSD; KSDR-FM; KWAT

History
- First air date: 1961
- Former call signs: KSDR (1961–1982); KLSC (1982–1985)

Technical information
- Licensing authority: FCC
- Facility ID: 20432
- Class: D
- Power: 1,000 watts day; 50 watts night
- Transmitter coordinates: 44°55′57.9″N 97°6′20.3″W

Links
- Public license information: Public file; LMS
- Website: www.gowatertown.net/stations/ksdr-am-1480/

KSDR (1480 kHz, "1480 Talk Radio") is an AM radio station serving Watertown, South Dakota. The station is owned and operated by Connoisseur Media.

== History ==
The station was assigned the KSDR call letters by the Federal Communications Commission.

KSDR was owned by Alpha Media after it purchased the stations of Digity, LLC, in 2015. Alpha Media merged with Connoisseur Media on September 4, 2025.
