= KPGT =

- Watertown, South Dakota; United States
- Broadcast area: Watertown SD area
- Frequency: 89.1 MHz

Programming
- Format: Religious

Ownership
- Owner: Harvest Community Baptist Church of Watertown, South Dakota

History
- Former call signs: KJBB (2000–2012)

Technical information
- Licensing authority: FCC
- Facility ID: 93041
- Class: A
- ERP: 200 watts
- HAAT: 6 meters
- Transmitter coordinates: 44°53′57″N 97°6′18″W

Links
- Public license information: Public file; LMS
- Webcast: Listen Live
- Website: https://www.thetruthfm.org/

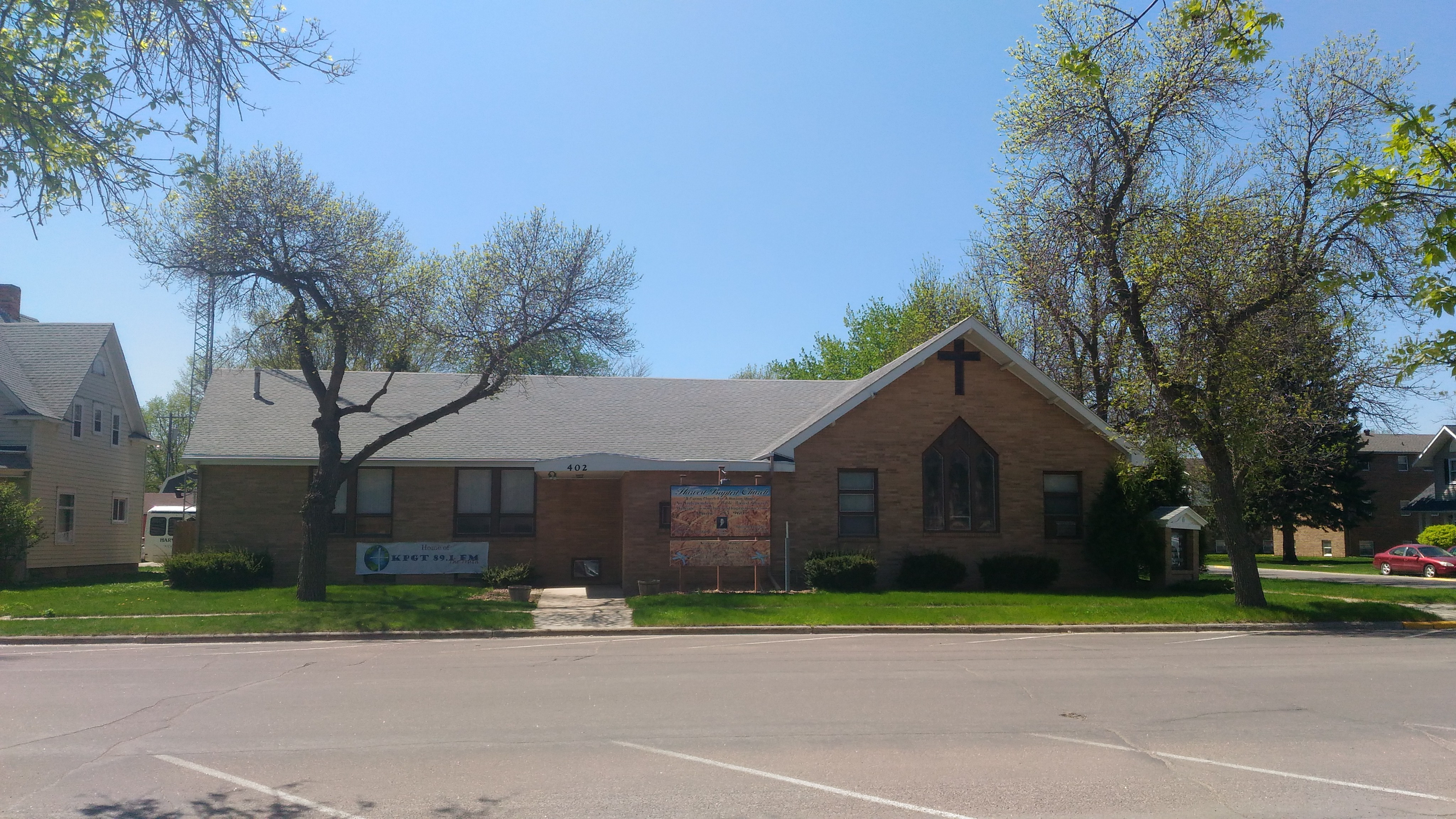
KPGT, May 2017

KPGT (89.1 FM) is a radio station broadcasting a religious format. Licensed to Watertown, South Dakota, United States, the station serves the Watertown area. The station is owned by Harvest Community Baptist Church of Watertown, South Dakota.

== Construction permit ==
KPGT has been granted a U.S. Federal Communications Commission construction permit to raise its ERP to 30,000 watts and increase its height above average terrain (HAAT) to 239 meters.
