= KSDR-FM =

Radio station in Watertown, South Dakota

Coordinates: 45.175°N 96.988°W

- Watertown, South Dakota; United States
- Frequency: 92.9 MHz
- Branding: New Country KS93

Programming
- Format: Country music

Ownership
- Owner: Connoisseur Media; (Alpha 3E Licensee, LLC)
- Sister stations: KDLO-FM; KIXX; KKSD; KSDR; KWAT

History
- First air date: 1992

Technical information
- Licensing authority: FCC
- Class: C1
- ERP: 97,000 watts
- HAAT: 298 meters (978 ft)

Links
- Public license information: Public file; LMS
- Webcast: Listen live
- Website: www.gowatertown.net/stations/newcountryks93/

KSDR-FM (92.9 MHz, "New Country KS93") is a country music formatted radio station broadcasting to the Watertown, South Dakota area. The station is owned and operated by Connoisseur Media.

== History ==
KSDR-FM was owned by Alpha Media after it purchased the stations of Digity, LLC, in 2015. Alpha Media merged with Connoisseur Media on September 4, 2025.
