= KDLO-FM =

Radio station in Watertown, South Dakota

- Watertown, South Dakota; United States
- Frequency: 96.9 MHz
- Branding: KDLO Country

Programming
- Format: Classic country
- Affiliations: United Stations Radio Networks

Ownership
- Owner: Connoisseur Media; (Alpha 3E License, LLC)
- Sister stations: KIXX; KKSD; KSDR; KSDR-FM; KWAT

History
- First air date: 1968
- Call sign meaning: Signed on as sister station to KDLO-TV

Technical information
- Licensing authority: FCC
- Facility ID: 60865
- Class: C
- ERP: 100,000 watts
- HAAT: 479 meters (1,572 ft)
- Transmitter coordinates: 44°57′56.8″N 97°35′23.2″W

Links
- Public license information: Public file; LMS
- Webcast: Listen live
- Website: www.kdlocountry.com; www.gowatertown.net

KDLO-FM (96.9 MHz) is a radio station broadcasting a classic country format serving Watertown, South Dakota, United States. The station is owned by Connoisseur Media, through licensee Alpha 3E License, LLC. The 100,000 watt, 1,600-foot (490 m) tower is located in Garden City, South Dakota.

== History ==
KDLO-FM went on the air in 1968 and was the sister station to KDLO-TV, which was licensed to nearby Florence. Midcontinent Broadcasting owned both stations until 1994, when KDLO-FM was sold to the Sorenson Broadcasting Corporation. Sorenson was later bought by Digity, which in turn sold all its stations to Alpha Media.

On May 22, 2024, Alpha cut ties with all local broadcasters of the South Dakota stations. Informing them only after their shift was over they were no longer employed. Alpha Media merged with Connoisseur Media on September 4, 2025.

== Programming ==
John Seiber, formerly of KBWS-FM in Sisseton, South Dakota, is the morning announcer for this station.
