= Kampeska, South Dakota =

Unincorporated community in South Dakota, U.S.

Coordinates: 44°52′48″N 97°16′07″W

Kampeska is an unincorporated community in Codington County, in the U.S. state of South Dakota.

== History ==
Kampeska was platted in 1883. The community took its name from nearby Lake Kampeska. The Kampeska post office closed in 1928.

== Notable people ==
- Arthur C. Mellette, (resided on Lake Kampeska), first Governor of South Dakota and last Governor of the Dakota Territory.
- Fred H. Hildebrandt, (resided on Lake Kampeska), U.S. Representative from South Dakota.
