= Leo Credlin =

Australian rules footballer, born 1903

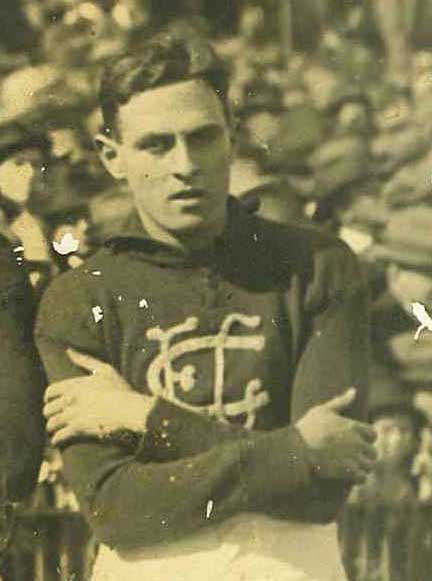
- Credlin in 1922

Personal information
- Full name: Harold Leo Credlin
- Born: 16 June 1903; Inglewood, Victoria
- Died: 27 March 1983 (aged 79); Doncaster, Victoria
- Original team: Inglewood
- Height: 183 cm (6 ft 0 in)
- Weight: 80 kg (176 lb)

Playing career^{1}
| Years | Club | Games (Goals) |
| 1922–25 | Carlton | 16 (18) |
| 1930 | North Melbourne | 1 (0) |
| Total | | 17 (18) |
- ^{1} Playing statistics correct to the end of 1930.

Harold Leo Credlin (16 June 1903 – 27 March 1983) was an Australian rules footballer who played with Carlton and North Melbourne in the Victorian Football League (VFL).
