= George R. Mather =

United States Army general (1911–1993)

George Robinson Mather
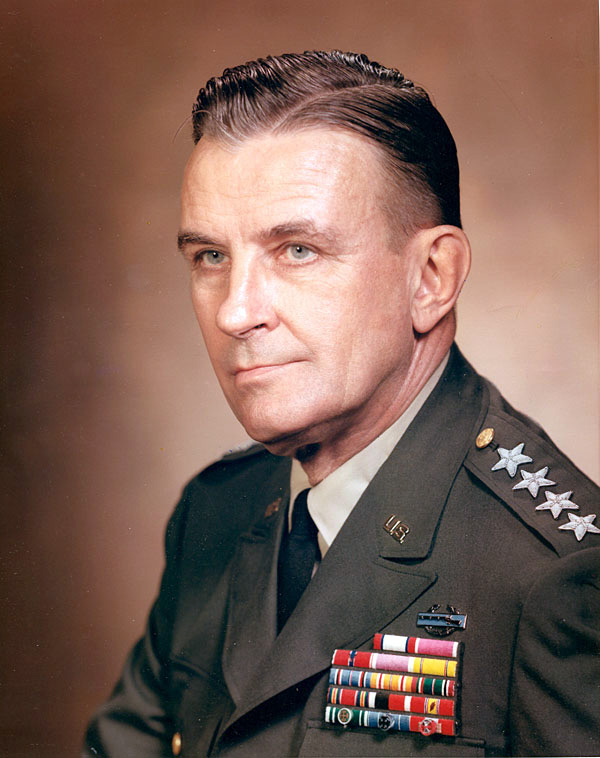
- Born: 2 June 1911; Watertown, South Dakota
- Died: 1 January 1993 (aged 81); Southern Pines, North Carolina
- Military career
- Allegiance: United States of America
- Branch: United States Army
- Service years: 1932–1971
- Rank: General
- Commands: United States Southern Command; III Corps; V Corps; 2nd Armored Division
- Conflicts: World War II; Cold War
- Awards: Distinguished Service Medal (2); Legion of Merit; Bronze Star; Purple Heart

George Robinson Mather (2 June 1911 – 1 January 1993) was a United States Army four-star general who served as Commander in Chief, United States Southern Command (USCINCSO) from 1969 to 1971.

== Early life and education ==
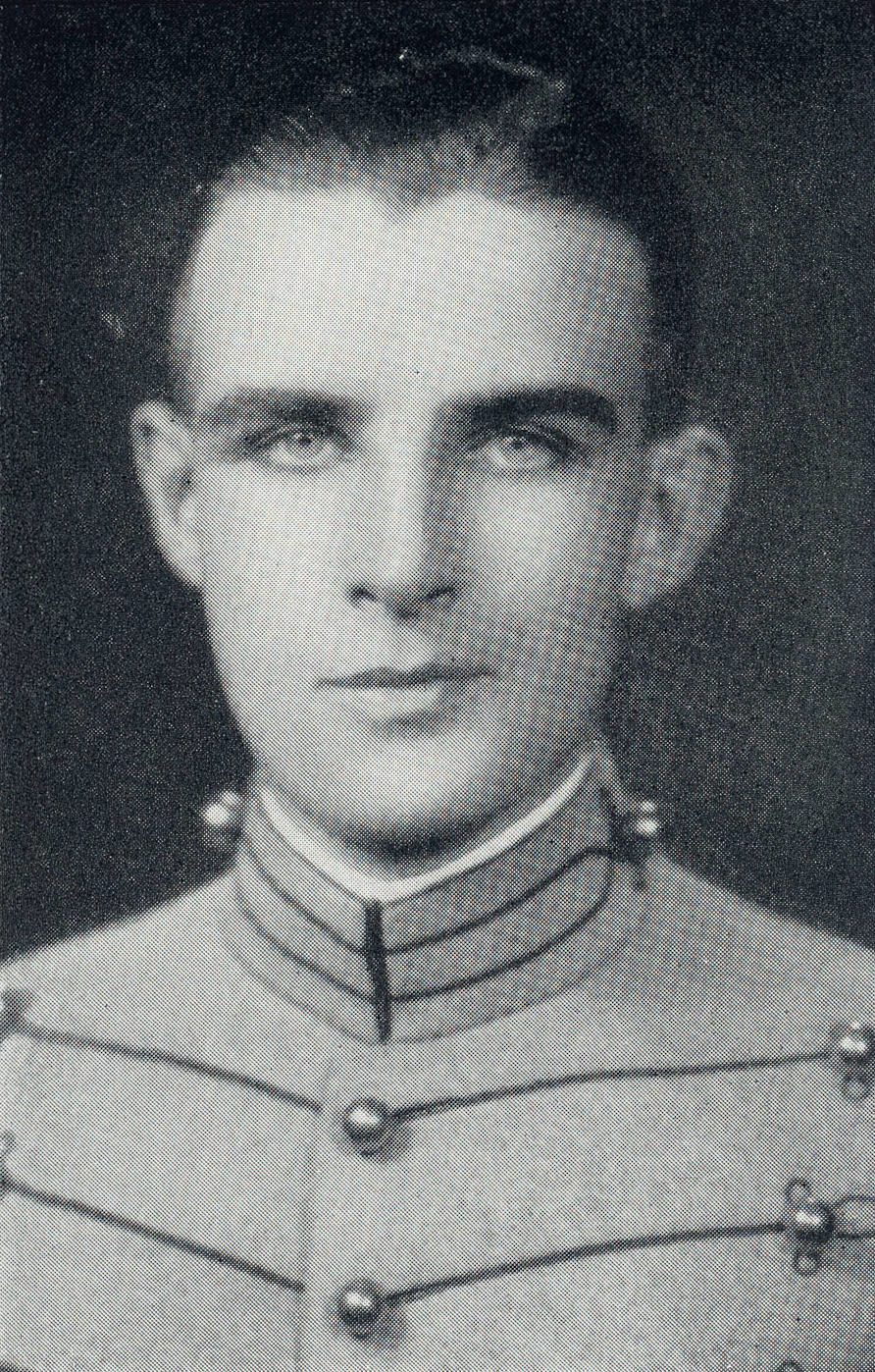
Mather as a West Point cadet in 1932

Mather was born in Watertown, South Dakota, on 2 June 1911. He was appointed to the United States Military Academy at West Point and in 1932 he graduated and was commissioned in the cavalry. He studied Spanish at the National Autonomous University of Mexico in 1937 and then returned to West Point to teach Spanish for four years.

== Military career ==
During World War II, he served as Executive Officer of the 110th Infantry Regiment of the 28th Infantry Division and was decorated for his actions in the Battle of Hürtgen Forest. From 1946 to 1948, he served on the staff of the Caribbean Command in the Panama Canal Zone, beginning a long association with Latin America. Following an assignment as Chief of Staff, Fourth United States Army at Fort Sam Houston in 1961, he was assigned as chairman, United States Delegation, Joint Brazil-United States Military Assistance Advisory Group in Rio de Janeiro until September 1964.

In 1965, he assumed command of the 2nd Armored Division at Fort Hood. Following that assignment, he served as the United States Military Representative to the Permanent Military Deputies Group, Central Treaty Organization located in Ankara, Turkey. He next took command of V Corps in 1966, returning stateside in 1967 to command III Corps. He became the first Director of Civil Disturbance Planning and Operations in July 1968. His final assignment was as Commander in Chief, United States Southern Command. He retired from the army in 1971.

Mather's awards and decorations included the Army Distinguished Service Medal with oak leaf cluster, the Legion of Merit, the Bronze Star Medal with "V" device, the Purple Heart, the Combat Infantryman Badge and the Ordem do Mérito Aeronáutico from Brazil, provided for service, in 1964.

- Army Distinguished Service Medal with oak leaf cluster
- Legion of Merit
- Bronze Star with "V" device
- Purple Heart
- Order of Military Merit (Brazil), Commander
- Order of Aeronautical Merit (Brazil), Commander
- Order of Naval Merit (Brazil), Grand Cross

== Post-retirement ==
Mather retired to Pinehurst, North Carolina, and served two terms as a village councilman. He died on 1 January 1993, in Southern Pines, North Carolina, survived by a son and daughter.
