= Nancy Turbak Berry =

American politician

Member of the South Dakota Senate from the 5th district
- In office 2006–2010

Personal details
- Born: September 17, 1956 (age 69) Watertown, South Dakota
- Party: Democratic
- Education: Harvard University (BA); UC Berkeley School of Law (JD)
- Profession: Attorney

Nancy J. Turbak Berry (born September 17, 1956) is a former Democratic member of the South Dakota Senate, representing the 5th district from 2006 to 2010.

== Early life and education ==
Nancy Turbak was born in Watertown, South Dakota. She started school in a one-room schoolhouse in Kranzburg, South Dakota. She attended Harvard University where she graduated cum laude with a B.A. in government. She then went on to obtain her J.D. at the Boalt Hall School of Law at UC Berkeley.

== Career ==
Turbak practiced in a Minneapolis law firm for a number of years before returning to her hometown of Watertown, South Dakota, in 1982. She started the Turbak Law Office in Watertown and was a sole practitioner until her son, Seamus Culhane, a USD Law graduate, joined her practice in 2011. Turbak Berry is a former magistrate of the Unified Judicial System, and served for four years as in the South Dakota State Senate.

== Personal life ==
She is the mother of two sons, Seamus and Liam Culhane, and is married to another trial attorney, David Berry of Hilton Head, South Carolina.
