= Redlin Art Center =

Art gallery in Watertown, South Dakota

Coordinates: 44.8876°N 97.060°W

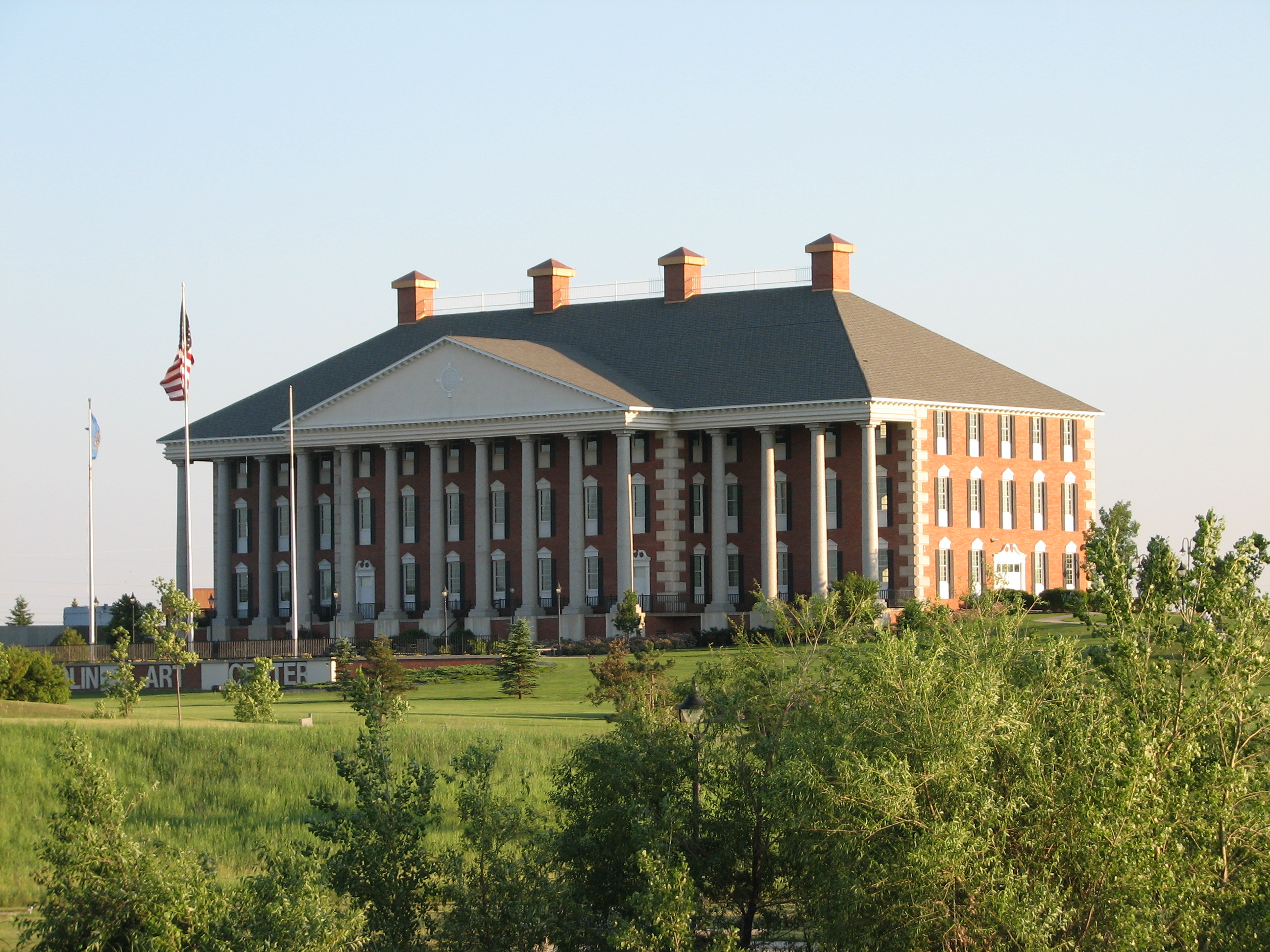
The Redlin Art Center main building

The Redlin Art Center is an art gallery located in Watertown, South Dakota, where over 150 of artist Terry Redlin's original paintings are displayed. The center cost $10 million to build, and opened on June 7, 1997 with 100 paintings; it covers 52,000 square feet (4,800 m^{2}). The building was designed by Terry Redlin's son, Charles Redlin. It has a brick facade with columns made of white granite, and the galleries inside are decorated with white and black granite.
