= Terry Redlin =

American painter (1937–2016)

Terry Avon Redlin (July 11, 1937 – April 24, 2016) was an American illustrator popular for painting outdoor themes and wildlife, often pictured in twilight. During the 1990s he was frequently named "America's most popular artist" in annual gallery surveys conducted by U.S. Art magazine.

== Early life and career ==
Redlin was born and raised in Watertown, South Dakota. He originally planned to become a forest ranger, but at 15 was disabled in a motorcycle accident. In 1967 Redlin and his family moved to Forest Lake, Minnesota. He earned a degree from the St. Paul School of Associated Arts in St. Paul, Minnesota, and spent 25 years working in commercial art as a layout artist, graphic designer, illustrator and art director.

Redlin's painting Winter Snows appeared on the cover of The Farmer magazine in 1977. Two years later, he became a full-time illustrator. He retired in 2007 after being diagnosed with dementia that proved to be caused by Alzheimer's disease.

In addition to individual works, Redlin produced series of paintings on the first stanza of "America the Beautiful" (1992) and on the life of an American boy, based on his own life (An American Portrait, 2004).

== Honors ==
Redlin was many times in the 1990s named "America's most popular artist" in U.S. Art magazine's annual surveys of gallery sales. In 1992 the magazine inducted him into its hall of fame. He won the Minnesota Duck Stamp contest twice and the state trout stamp contest once, and in 1982 came second in the Federal Duck Stamp contest.

== Legacy ==
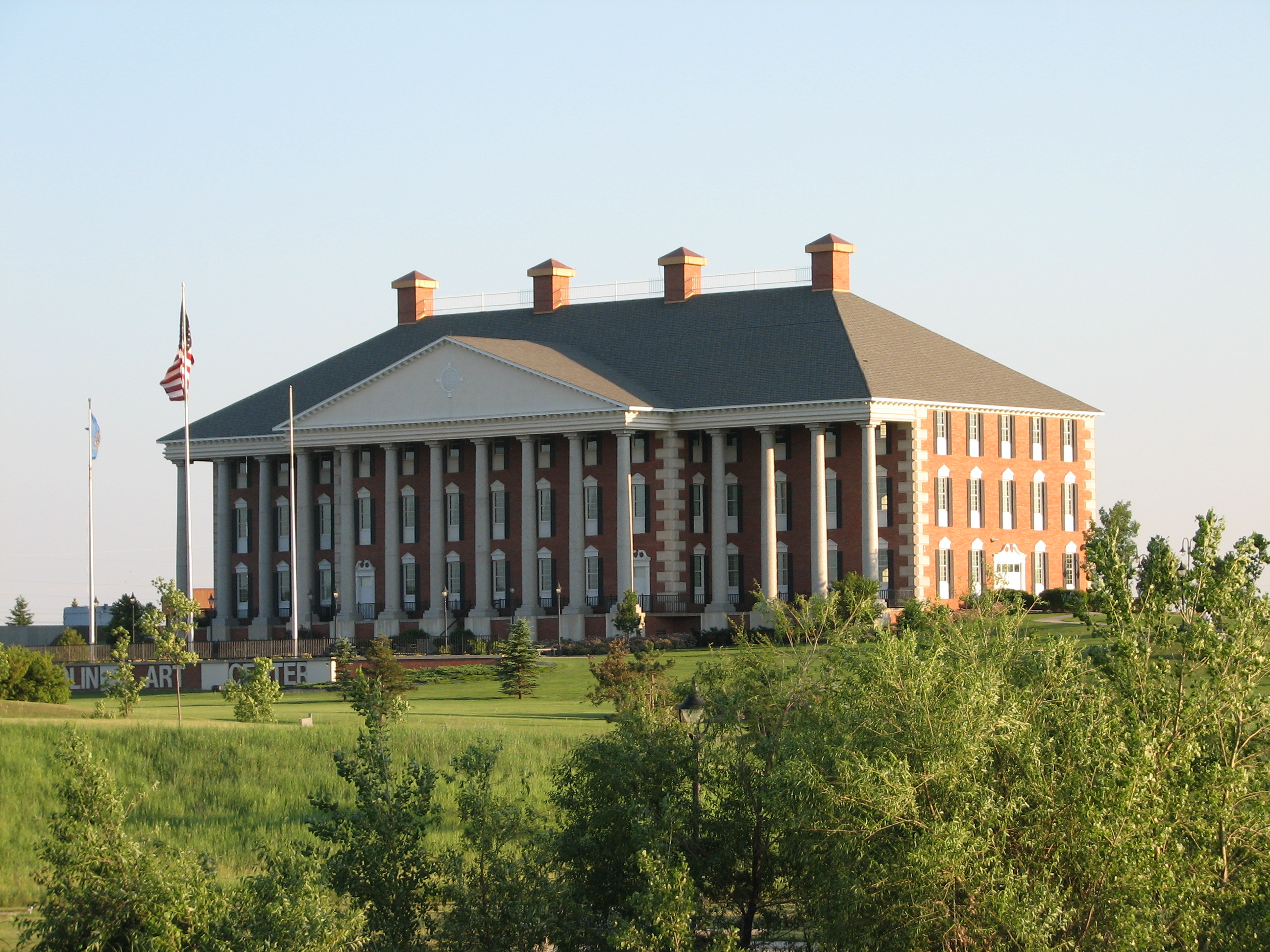
Redlin Art Center main building

Built in 1997, the Redlin Art Center in Watertown is devoted to his works. The Terry Redlin Environmental Center, also in Watertown, opened in 2010; Redlin was known for his donations to raise funds for conservation, including a record $28 million for Ducks Unlimited. The Terry Redlin Elementary School in Sioux Falls, South Dakota, opened in 1998, was named in his honor.

== Personal life ==
He married Helene Marie Langenfeld in 1956, when they were both 19 years old; they had three children.

Redlin died at a retirement home in Watertown, South Dakota on April 24, 2016, at the age of 78.
