= 1981 F1 Powerboat World Championship =

1981 F1 Powerboat World Championship
| Previous: | none | Next: | 1982 |

The 1981 John Player Special Formula 1 World Series was the inaugural season of Formula 1 Powerboat racing. Representing the 'OZ' racing class of the period, the championship was formed as a consequence of a difference of opinion between the leading figures in powerboat racing at the time, and was heavily supported by both John Player and engine manufacturer Outboard Marine Corporation, whose Johnson and Evinrude branded engines were used by the entire field. Whilst the series was designed to showcase the firm's huge 3.5 litre V8 engines, the very first race saw all boats using smaller V6 units and only six drivers would be given the V8 engines for the remainder of the year.

Renato Molinari was the series' first ever champion, winning four of the five races he contested. In total, six races made up the 1981 world championship, beginning in Como, Italy and ending in Den Bosch, Netherlands. An additional non-championship invitational race, the British Grand Prix, was also held at Chasewater.

== Teams and drivers ==
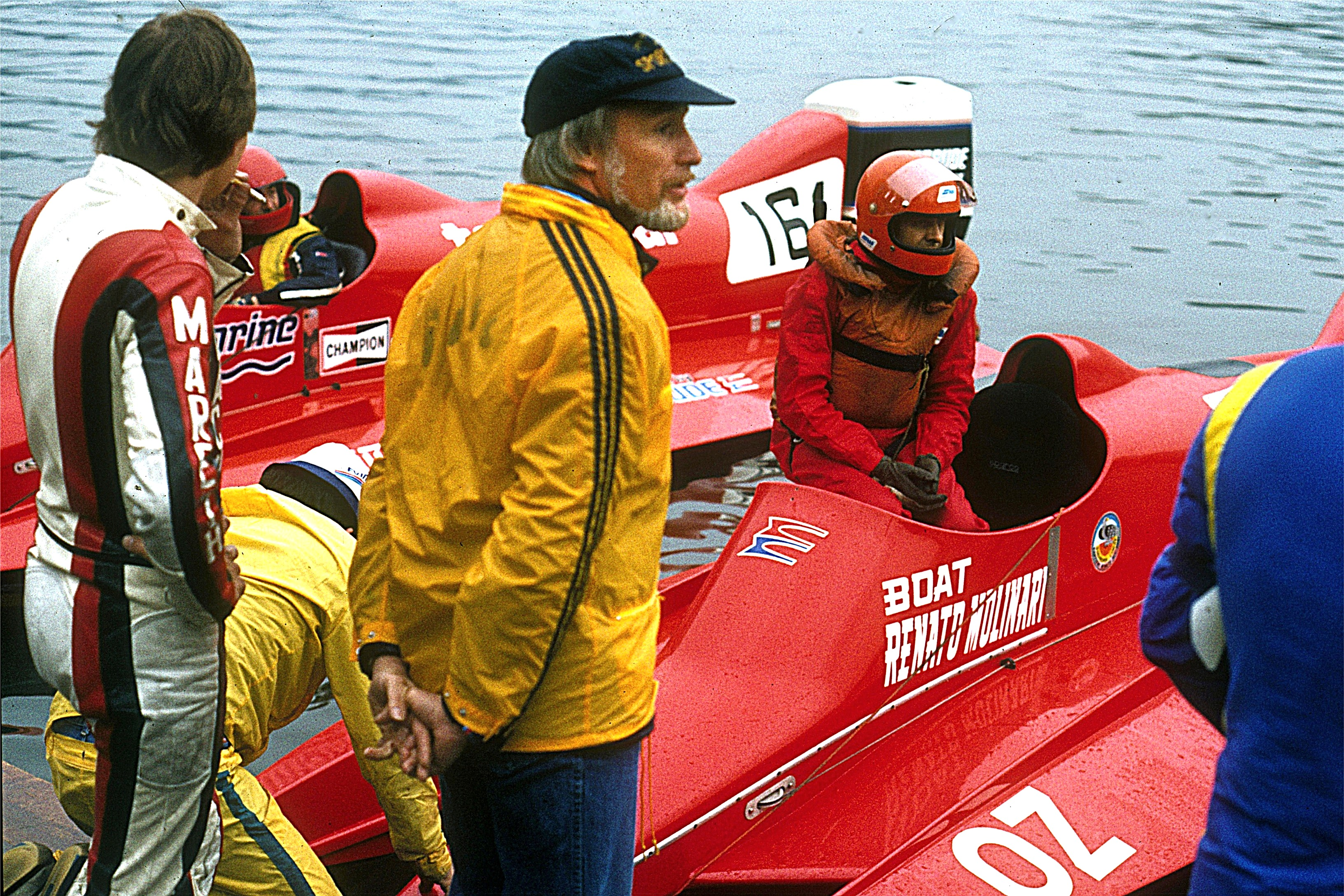
The Tecnocar Squadra Corse boats at the Grand Prix of Germany.

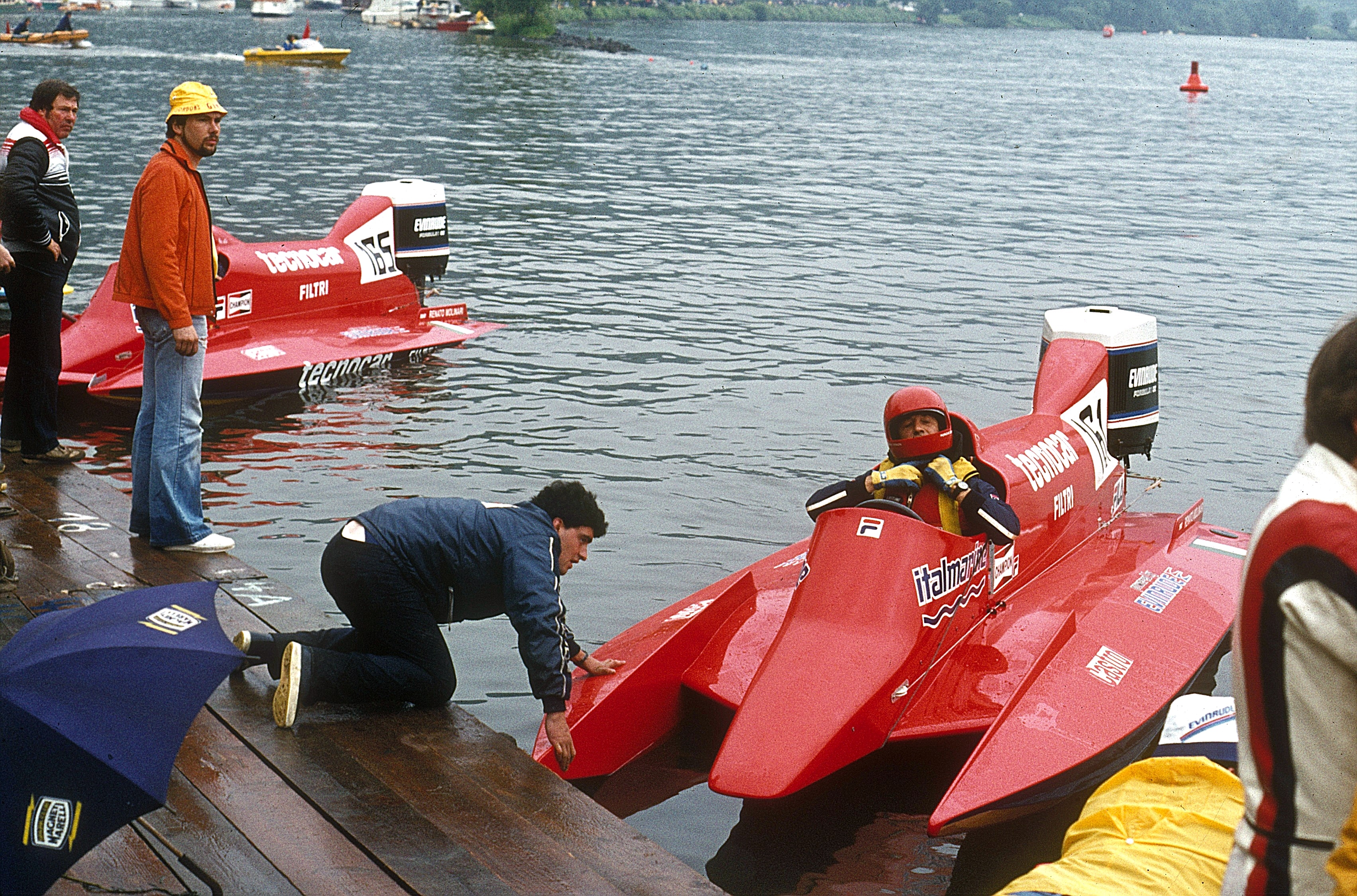
Lillo Columbo and Renato Molinari at the Grand Prix of Germany.

| Team | Hull | Engine | No. | Race drivers | Rounds |
|---|---|---|---|---|---|
| (Netherlands) Velden Beneteau Racing | Velden | Johnson 3.0 V6 | 1 | (Netherlands) Cees van der Velden | 1 |
| (Netherlands) Velden Beneteau Racing | Velden | Johnson 3.5 V8 | 1 | (Netherlands) Cees van der Velden | 2–6 |
| (Netherlands) Velden Beneteau Racing | Velden | Johnson 3.0 V6 | 8 | (Netherlands) Arthur Mostert | 2–6 |
| (United Kingdom) Gordon's Gin | Velden | Johnson 3.0 V6 | 9 | (United Kingdom) Roger Jenkins | 1 |
| (United Kingdom) Gordon's Gin | Velden | Johnson 3.5 V8 | 9 | (United Kingdom) Roger Jenkins | 2–6 |
| (United Kingdom) Gordon's Gin | Velden | Johnson 3.0 V6 | 19 | (United Kingdom) Rick Frost | 3 |
| (United Kingdom) Team John Player Special | Velden | Johnson 3.0 V6 | 10 | (United Kingdom) Tom Percival | 1 |
| (United Kingdom) Team John Player Special | Velden | Johnson 3.5 V8 | 10 | (United Kingdom) Tom Percival | 2–6 |
| (United Kingdom) Team John Player Special | Velden | Johnson 3.0 V6 | 11 | (United Kingdom) Bob Spalding | 1 |
| (United Kingdom) Team John Player Special | Velden | Johnson 3.5 V8 | 11 | (United Kingdom) Bob Spalding | 2–6 |
| (United Kingdom) Team John Player Special | Velden | Johnson 3.0 V6 | 12 | (France) Francois Salabert | All |
| (United Kingdom) Andy Bullen | Velden | Evinrude 3.0 V6 | 16 | (United Kingdom) Andy Bullen | 1–2 |
| (Italy) Tecnocar Squadra Corse | Molinari | Evinrude 3.0 V6 | 161 | (Italy) Lillo Colombo | 1 |
| (Italy) Tecnocar Squadra Corse | Molinari | Evinrude 3.5 V8 | 161 | (Italy) Lillo Colombo | 2–6 |
| (Italy) Tecnocar Squadra Corse | Molinari | Evinrude 3.0 V6 | 165 | (Italy) Renato Molinari | 1 |
| (Italy) Tecnocar Squadra Corse | Molinari | Evinrude 3.5 V8 | 165 | (Italy) Renato Molinari | 2–5 |
| (Netherlands) Hans Pelster | Velden | Evinrude 3.0 V6 | | (Netherlands) Hans Pelster | 1–5 |

== Season calendar ==
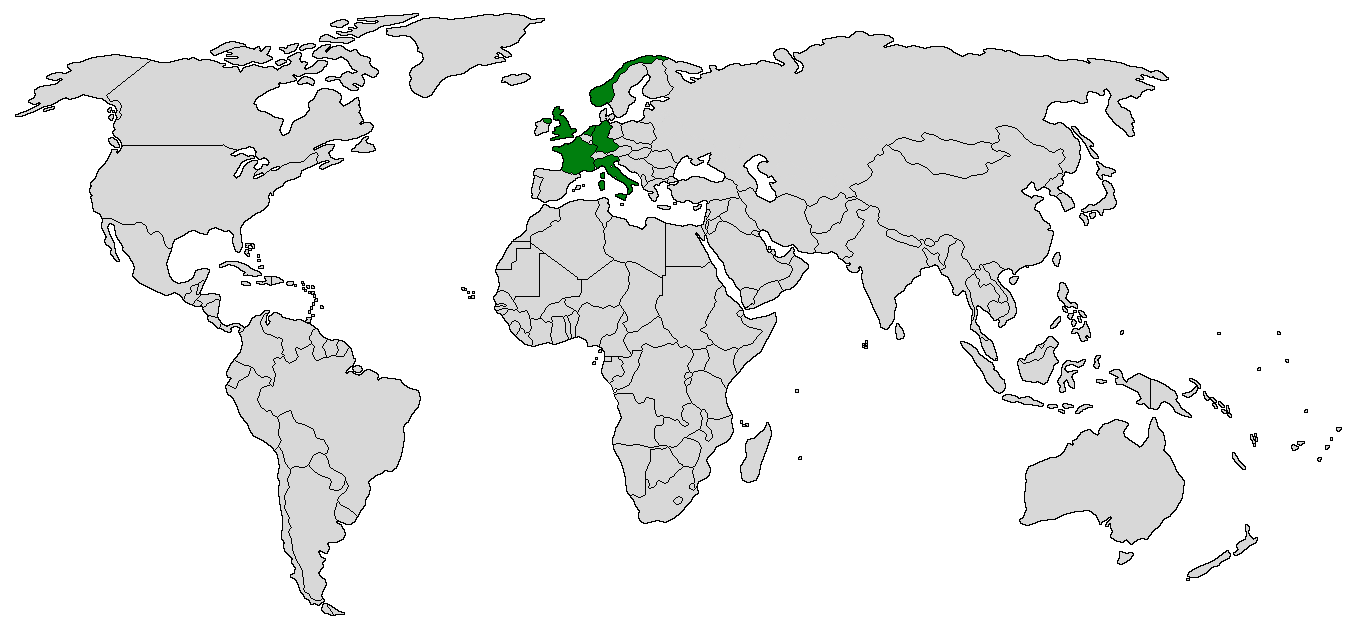
Countries that hosted F1 Powerboat races in 1981, shown in green.

| Round | Race title | Date | Circuit location | Race winner | Hull/Engine |
|---|---|---|---|---|---|
| 1 | 1st Grand Prix of Italy | 17 May | Como | (Italy) Renato Molinari | Molinari/Evinrude |
| 2 | (West Germany) 1st Grand Prix of Germany | 21 June | Brodenbach | (Italy) Renato Molinari | Molinari/Evinrude |
| 3 | (United Kingdom) 1st Grand Prix of Britain^{1} | 31 August | Holme Pierrepont | (Italy) Renato Molinari | Molinari/Evinrude |
| 4 | 1st Grand Prix of Norway | | Drammen | (Italy) Renato Molinari | Molinari/Evinrude |
| 5 | 1st Grand Prix of France | | Vichy | (Netherlands) Cees van der Velden | Velden/Johnson |
| 6 | 1st Grand Prix of the Netherlands | | Den Bosch | (United Kingdom) Bob Spalding | Velden/Johnson |

- ^1 The British round of the championship was known as the John Player Grand Prix for sponsorship reasons.

=== Non-championship events ===
| Race title | Date | Circuit location | Race winner | Hull/Engine |
|---|---|---|---|---|
| (United Kingdom) British Grand Prix | 12 July | Chasewater | (Netherlands) Cees van der Velden | Velden/Johnson |

== Results and standings ==
Points were awarded to the top six finishers based on the aggregated results of between one and four heat races during the event. Any drivers below sixth place were not classified (NC).

| Position | **1st** | **2nd** | **3rd** | **4th** | **5th** | **6th** |
| Points | 9 | 6 | 4 | 3 | 2 | 1 |

=== Drivers standings ===
| Pos | Driver | ITA (Italy) | GER (West Germany) | GBR (United Kingdom) | NOR (Norway) | FRA (France) | NED (Netherlands) | Points |
|---|---|---|---|---|---|---|---|---|
| 1 | (Italy) Renato Molinari | 1 | 1 | 1 | 1 | 2 | | 42 |
| 2 | (Netherlands) Cees van der Velden | 2 | NC | 2 | 5 | 1 | 3 | 27 |
| 3 | (United Kingdom) Bob Spalding | NC | 3 | 3 | 2 | 3 | 1 | 27 |
| 4 | (United Kingdom) Tom Percival | 4 | 5 | 5 | 3 | 5 | 4 | 16 |
| 5 | (United Kingdom) Roger Jenkins | 5 | NC | 6 | NC | 4 | 2 | 12 |
| 6 | (France) Francois Salabert | 3 | 2 | NC | NC | 6 | NC | 11 |
| 7 | (Italy) Lillo Colombo | 6 | 4 | NC | 4 | NC | 5 | 9 |
| 8 | (Netherlands) Arthur Mostert | | 6 | 4 | NC | NC | 6 | 5 |
| 9 | (Netherlands) Hans Pelster | NC | NC | NC | 6 | NC | | 1 |
| 10 | (United Kingdom) Andy Bullen | NC | NC | | | | | 0 |
| 11 | (United Kingdom) Rick Frost | | | NC | | | | 0 |

Key
| Colour | Result |
|---|---|
| Gold | Winner |
| Silver | Second place |
| Bronze | Third place |
| Green | Other points position |
| Blue | Other classified position |
| Blue | Not classified, finished (NC) |
| Purple | Not classified, retired (Ret) |
| Red | Did not qualify (DNQ) |
| Red | Did not pre-qualify (DNPQ) |
| Black | Disqualified (DSQ) |
| White | Did not start (DNS) |
| White | Race cancelled (C) |
| Blank | Did not practice (DNP) |
| Blank | Excluded (EX) |
| Blank | Did not arrive (DNA) |
| Blank | Withdrawn (WD) |
| Blank | Did not enter (cell empty) |
| Text formatting | Meaning |
| **Bold** | Pole position |
| Italics | Fastest lap |
