= Murder of Frances Slater =

1982 kidnapping and murder of a convenience store clerk in Florida

Frances Julia Slater
- Frances Julia Slater
- Born: April 29, 1963; Florida, U.S.
- Died: April 27, 1982 (aged 18); Stuart, Florida, U.S.
- Cause of death: Fatal gunshot wound to the head
- Other name: Frannie
- Known for: Murder victim
- Mother: Sally Slater Campbell
- Relatives: Richard Campbell (stepfather); Cathy Slater Springston (twin sister); Ralph Evinrude (grandfather); Frances Langford (step-grandmother)

On April 27, 1982, in Stuart, Florida, 18-year-old Frances Julia Slater (April 29, 1963 – April 27, 1982), a convenience store clerk and granddaughter of the Evinrude Outboard Motors president Ralph Evinrude, was kidnapped by a group of four men, who later robbed, stabbed and shot Slater to death. The four murderers were later arrested and charged with murdering Slater. One of the convicted killers was sentenced to life imprisonment for first-degree murder and kidnapping, while the remaining three men were sentenced to death.

== Abduction and murder ==
On April 27, 1982, two days before her 19th birthday, 18-year-old Frances Julia Slater, the granddaughter of Outboard Marine Corporation president Ralph Evinrude and step-granddaughter of retired actress-singer Frances Langford, was kidnapped and killed by a group of four men in Stuart, Florida.

Slater was on her work shift as a clerk at a convenience store. At around 3:00am, two of her kidnappers entered the store to rob Slater and took approximately $134 from the cash register and the store's floor safe. Slater was abducted from the store and forcibly placed inside the car of John Earl Bush, which was occupied by Bush and his accomplices: 19-year-old J. B. "Pig" Parker, 23-year-old Alphonso Cave, and 25-year-old Terry Wayne Johnson (born January 27, 1957). A female newspaper delivery worker testified that she was passing by the store between 2:30am and 3:00am, and witnessed two African-American men (one of whom she identified as Bush) inside the store at the time of Slater's kidnapping.

After driving for 13 miles, the car stopped at a secluded area, and Slater was pushed out of the vehicle. Bush used a knife to stab Slater, and afterwards, Parker wielded Bush's gun and shot her in the back of the head. Slater died as a result of the gunshot wound, and her body was left behind by the four kidnappers, who drove away from the area.

Slater's body was found by a farmer driving a tractor near the murder site. Autopsy results showed that Slater had a single gunshot wound to the head, one stab wound each to the neck and abdomen, and no signs of sexual assault. At the time of her death, Slater was residing in Jensen Beach with her twin sister, mother and stepfather, and according to her family, that day was supposed to be Slater's last midnight work shift. Despite their advice to not work there anymore, Slater still fulfilled her responsibility. According to Slater's grandfather Ralph Evinrude, his granddaughter was "an outgoing athletic girl" who still chose to work despite her affluent family background and having owned a small estate solely under her name and some stock to support her education.

== Trial of the four kidnappers ==
=== Arrest and charges ===
On May 5, 1982, three of the suspects, J. B. Parker, Alphonso Cave, and John Bush, were arrested for the murder of Frances Slater. The final suspect, Terry Johnson, surrendered himself to the police. The four were all charged with kidnapping, robbery with a firearm and first-degree murder.

On May 21, 1982, a Martin County grand jury indicted all four men for the murder and abduction of Slater.

=== John Bush ===
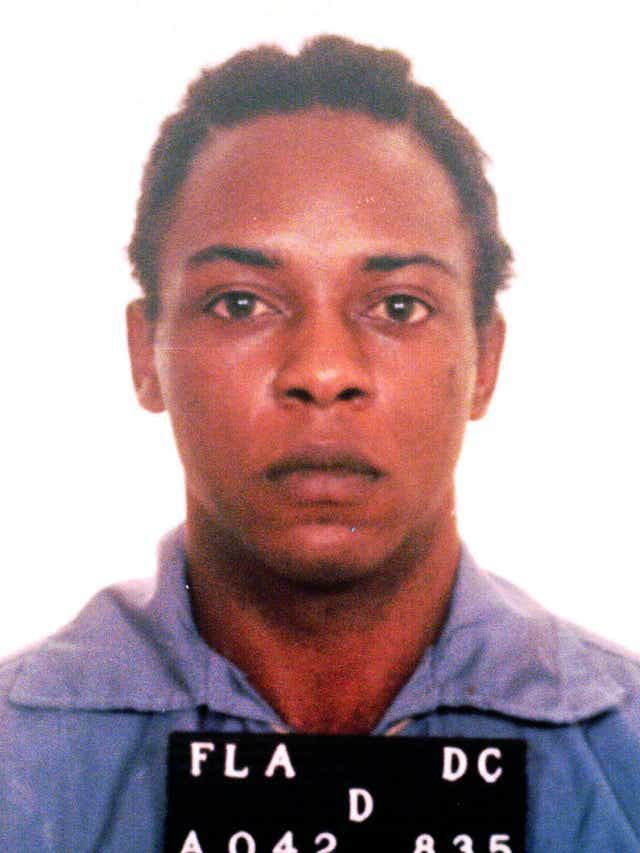
John Earl Bush

On November 19, 1982, Bush was found guilty of first-degree murder by a Lee County jury, becoming the first to be convicted for murdering Slater. The prosecution sought the death penalty for Bush during the sentencing phase of his trial. Earlier during the trial, the defense argued that Bush never had the intention to kill Slater and pointed out the stab wound in her abdomen should have been deeper had he really intended to cause her death, but the prosecution countered that Bush had intentionally stabbed her in order to "rip her insides out" and the coroner certified that Slater possibly backed away to avoid the stabbing, which likely made the wound not deep enough.

On November 23, 1982, Bush was sentenced to death in the electric chair by Circuit Judge C. Pfeiffer Trowbridge, after the jury voted 7–5 for the death penalty (the minimum majority vote required for a death sentence).

=== Alphonso Cave ===
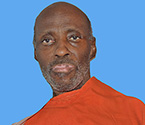
Alphonso Cave

On December 8, 1982, Cave became the second person found guilty of the murder of Slater in the first degree. On December 10, 1982, he was sentenced to death by Judge L.B. Vocelle, after the jury recommended the death penalty by a 7–5 vote. It was reported that prior to their decision, the jury had deadlocked twice on the death penalty with the vote tied at 6–6, before one of the jurors switched votes to reach 7–5. During sentencing, Judge Vocelle stated that there was no evidence to show if Cave had stabbed or shot Slater, but he held that Cave played a prominent role behind Slater's death.

=== J. B. Parker ===
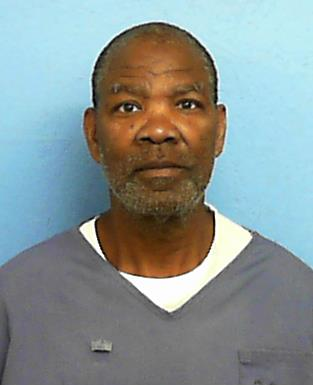
J. B. Parker

On January 8, 1983, a jury found Parker, deemed the shooter in the case, guilty of first-degree murder in the death of Slater.

On January 12, 1983, Parker became the third person sentenced to death via electrocution by Circuit Judge Philip Nourse, who followed the jury's 8–4 majority recommendation for capital punishment.

=== Terry Johnson ===
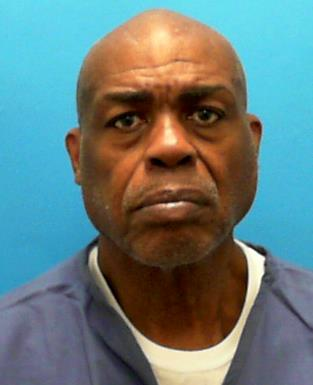
Terry Johnson

On April 8, 1983, Terry Johnson became the fourth and final kidnapper convicted of the first-degree murder of Slater. However, the death penalty was off the table for Johnson because he did not shoot the victim during the abduction, and played a lesser role than the trio condemned to death row for the same crime. Evidence showed that Johnson was drunk and passed out in the vehicle after kidnapping Slater, and hence he never took part in the shooting and stabbing of Slater.

On June 29, 1983, Johnson was sentenced to life in prison with the possibility of parole after a minimum of 25 years. An additional life sentence was also imposed for the other charge of kidnapping.

== Execution of John Bush ==
After he was sentenced to death, Bush appealed to the Florida Supreme Court to overturn his death sentence, but on November 29, 1984, the Florida Supreme Court dismissed his appeal.

On February 25, 1986, Bush's appeal was rejected by the U.S. Supreme Court.

Bush was scheduled to be executed on April 22, 1986, alongside another prisoner David Funchess, after then Governor Bob Graham signed both their death warrants in March 1986. However, 14 hours before Bush was to be executed, the Florida Supreme Court granted an indefinite stay of execution for Bush.

On February 27, 1987, the Florida Supreme Court denied Bush's appeal of his death sentence.

A second death warrant was signed in January 1988 by then Governor Bob Martinez, rescheduling Bush's execution date for February 3, 1988. However, on the eve of his scheduled execution, Bush was granted a stay of execution by a federal judge.

On March 28, 1991, Bush's post-conviction appeal for a writ of habeas corpus was denied by the Florida Supreme Court.

On March 30, 1993, the 11th Circuit Court of Appeals dismissed Bush's federal appeal.

In September 1996, a third death warrant was signed for Bush, whose death sentence was scheduled to be carried out on October 21, 1996.

As a final recourse to escape execution, Bush filed last-minute appeals to stay his execution. At first, the Florida Supreme Court temporarily suspended his execution on October 16, 1996, but the 11th Circuit Court of Appeals rejected Bush's appeal and denied a stay on October 18, 1996. Finally, Bush appealed to the U.S. Supreme Court, but the appeal was denied on October 20, 1996, the eve of his execution.

On October 21, 1996, 38-year-old John Earl Bush was put to death by the electric chair at the Florida State Prison. During the week leading up to his execution, Bush received visits from his 16-year-old daughter, his sister, his brother-in-law and his father, and also called his father and brother (who was then incarcerated for robbery) on the morning of his execution.

== Fates of Parker, Johnson, and Cave ==
=== Johnson ===
On November 4, 2008, Johnson was granted parole and released after spending 25 years in prison. He returned to live in Fort Pierce, where his mother lived. After his release, Johnson was working as a day labor maintenance worker in a local stable at Palm Bay, Florida, and he was employed as a lawn maintenance foreman in Fort Pierce as of 2016.

Johnson was arrested for cocaine possession 14 years later, and in December 2024, he was convicted and sentenced to 38 months in prison for this new conviction.

As of 2025, Johnson was imprisoned at the Hardee Correctional Institution.

=== Cave ===
After his sentencing, Alphonso Cave appealed to the Florida Supreme Court, but on August 30, 1985, the appeal was dismissed.

Initially, Cave's death sentence was scheduled to be carried out on July 6, 1988. Cave lost his appeal to the Florida Supreme Court on July 1, 1988, and later appealed to the federal courts to postpone his execution. A federal district judge issued a stay of execution on July 5, 1988.

Subsequently, a federal judge overturned Cave's death sentence and ordered him to be re-sentenced. On August 26, 1992, the 11th Circuit Court of Appeals agreed that Cave should be granted a re-sentencing trial since his trial counsel did not adequately defend him and prevent him from being sentenced to death.

On May 9, 1993, after a hearing, a second jury recommended the death penalty by a 10–2 vote. The judge followed the jury's recommendation and sentenced Cave to death a second time.

On September 21, 1995, the Florida Supreme Court once again vacated the death sentence of Cave and ordered him to be re-sentenced a second time.

At the end of Cave's second re-sentencing trial, he was sentenced to death a third time when the jury voted 11–1 in favor of capital punishment. On December 24, 1998, the Florida Supreme Court dismissed the appeal of Cave of his third death sentence.

On April 12, 2011, Cave's appeal to the 11th Circuit Court of Appeals was dismissed.

On June 12, 2020, the Florida Supreme Court dismissed Cave's petition for re-sentencing.

On August 3, 2023, 41 years after he murdered Frances Slater, 64-year-old Alphonso Cave died of unknown causes while on death row at the Union Correctional Institution.

=== Parker ===
Parker filed his first appeal in 1985 to the Florida Supreme Court, but on August 22, 1985, the appeal was rejected. On October 25, 1989, the Florida Supreme Court denied a second appeal from Parker.

On March 23, 1989, the Florida Supreme Court dismissed Parker's third appeal of his death sentence.

Parker was scheduled to be executed on October 31, 1989, but five days before it could proceed, Parker was granted a stay of execution.

On October 6, 1992, the 11th Circuit Court of Appeals dismissed Parker's federal appeal for post-conviction relief.

In 1998, the Florida Supreme Court overturned Parker's death sentence and ordered him to receive a re-sentencing trial.

In October 2000, Parker's re-sentencing trial began, and the defense argued for Parker to be re-sentenced to life imprisonment, and during the proceedings, Slater's mother appeared to testify about her grief of losing one of her twin daughters to murder, and stated that her other twin daughter suffered from severe emotional distress as a result of losing Slater.

On October 26, 2000, the jury voted 11–1 to re-sentence Parker to death. On December 15, 2000, the trial court re-instated Parker's death sentence.

On January 22, 2004, the Florida Supreme Court turned down Parker's appeal of his second death sentence.

On October 30, 2007, a Martin County circuit judge found Parker mentally competent to be executed, and denied his appeal.

On December 1, 2011, the Florida Supreme Court rejected Parker's second appeal.

In January 2016, the U.S. Supreme Court ruled in the case of Hurst v. Florida that the death penalty should be imposed by juries instead of judges, and further found that the judges from Florida had more prerogative in sentencing defendants to death compared to the juries. As the case also touched on arguments that death sentences should only be imposed via unanimous votes, it gave rise to the possibility of re-sentencing death row inmates whose sentences were non-unanimously meted out, and Parker was one of these inmates included due to the jury's vote of 11–1 in his latest sentencing trial.

In April 2017, Circuit Judge Gary Sweet approved Parker's case for re-sentencing, after the state's death penalty laws were amended in 2016 to allow a person to be sentenced to death by unanimous jury verdicts. On July 19, 2017, the prosecution stated they were willing to once again seek the death penalty for Parker, whose re-sentencing trial was likely to begin in a year's time.

On March 31, 2023, Parker was spared the death sentence and re-sentenced to life imprisonment with the possibility of parole after 25 years, after the prosecution decided to not seek the death penalty a third time. According to Chief Assistant State Attorney Stephen Gosnell, the time lapse of more than 40 years since the commission of the offense led to the erosion of the case, hence they chose to not pursue the death penalty.

As of 2025, Parker was incarcerated at the Tomoka Correctional Institution.

== Aftermath ==
In 2016, Slater's mother was interviewed. She stated that she still struggled with the sadness of losing her daughter, and she continued to seek retribution for Slater, hoping that Cave and Parker, who were both still on death row at that time, could be executed like Bush was in 1996.

Slater's mother stated that throughout the appeal process, she became acquainted with the mother of Johnson, who acted as the driver and played the smallest role of the four in her daughter's death. Slater's mother also stated she had forgiven Johnson and came to know that Johnson's mother was a good person and also religious, and she also did not oppose parole for Johnson when he was released in 2008. In the same article covering Slater's mother's interview, Johnson told the press through his supervision officer that he did not wish to talk about the murder, and he described the murder of Slater as a "dark chapter of his life".

== See also ==
- Capital punishment in Florida
- List of kidnappings (1980–1989)
- List of people executed in Florida
- List of people executed by electrocution (John Bush)
- List of people executed in the United States in 1996
