= Frances Langford =

American singer, entertainer and actress (1913–2005)

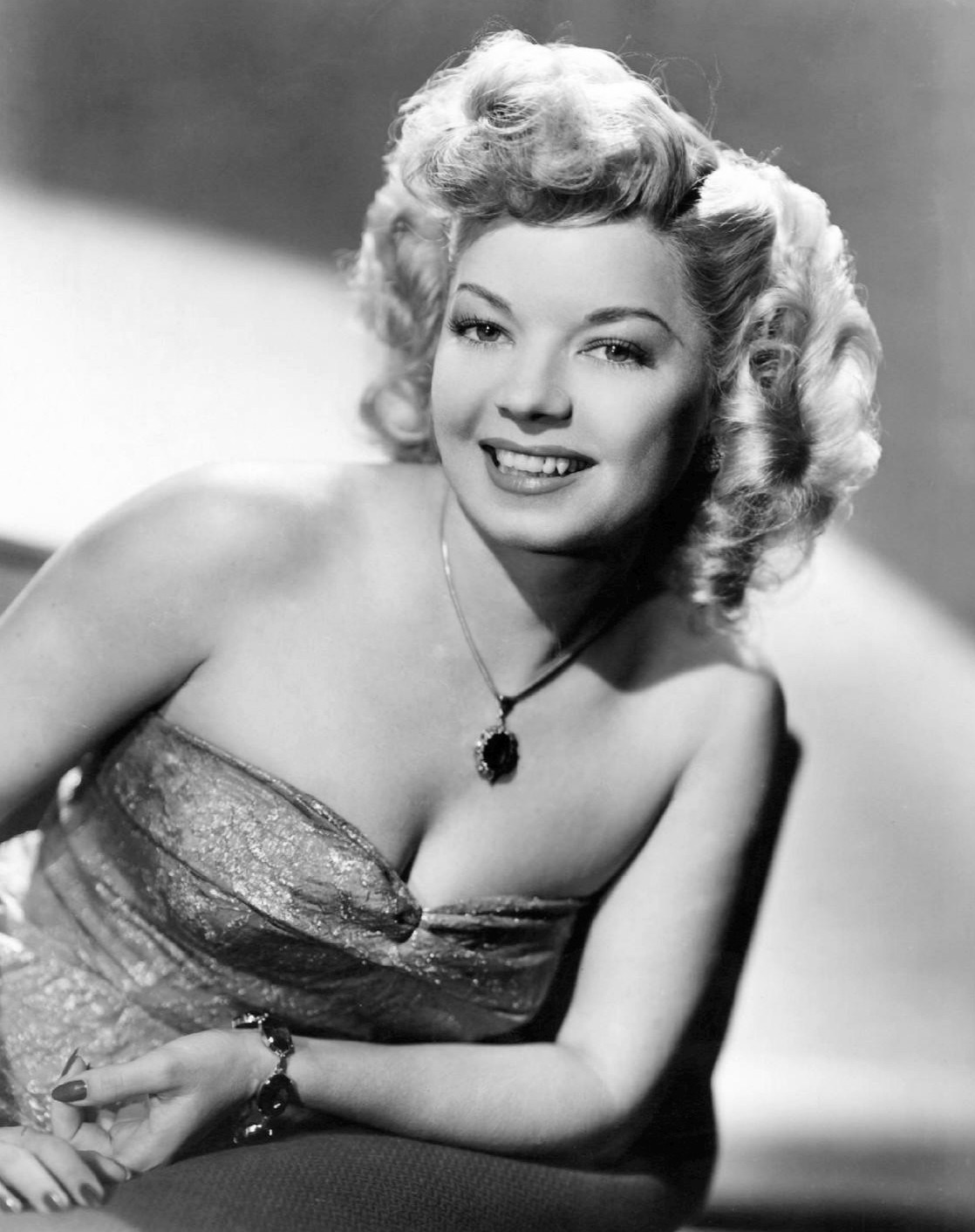
- Langford in 1946
- Born: Julia Frances Langford; April 4, 1913; Hernando, Florida, U.S.
- Died: July 11, 2005 (aged 92); Jensen Beach, Florida, U.S.
- Occupations: Singer, actress
- Years active: 1931–1956
- Spouses: Jon Hall (m. 1934; div. 1955) Ralph Evinrude (m. 1955; died 1986) Harold Stuart (m. 1994)

Frances Langford (née Julia Frances Langford; April 4, 1913 – July 11, 2005) was an American singer and actress who was popular during the Golden Age of Radio and made film and television appearances for over two decades.

She was known as the "GI Nightingale", an American armed-forces sweetheart, who entertained troops by frequently touring with Bob Hope. Langford is featured on the DVD Entertaining the Troops with Hope.

== Discovery ==
Julia Frances Langford originally trained as an opera singer. While a young girl she required a tonsillectomy that changed her soprano range to a rich contralto. As a result, she was forced to change her vocal approach to a more contemporary big band, popular music style. At age 17, she was singing for local dances. Cigar manufacturer Eli Witt heard her sing at an American Legion party and hired her to sing on a local radio show he sponsored.

Actor Dan White played an important role in her discovery. White and Langford were schoolmates. Langford first sang in public in an amateur show that White staged in Lakeland, Florida.

== Radio ==
After a brief stint in the Broadway musical "Here Goes the Bride" in 1931, she moved to Hollywood, appearing on Louella Parsons' radio show Hollywood Hotel while starting a movie career. Singing for radio during the early 1930s she was heard by Rudy Vallée, who invited her to become a regular on his radio show. From 1935 until 1938 she was a regular performer on Dick Powell's radio show. From 1946 to 1951, she performed with Don Ameche as the insufferable wife, Blanche, on the radio comedy The Bickersons.

== Films ==
Langford made her film debut in Every Night at Eight (1935), introducing what became her signature song: "I'm in the Mood for Love". She then began appearing frequently in films such as Broadway Melody of 1936 (1935) (in which she popularized "Broadway Rhythm" and "You Are My Lucky Star"), Born to Dance (1936), Too Many Girls (1940) (in which she acted alongside her childhood schoolmate from Lakeland Dan White), and Yankee Doodle Dandy (1942) with James Cagney, in which (portraying Nora Bayes) she performed the popular song "Over There". She also appeared on screen in Dixie Jamboree and Radio Stars on Parade. In 1946 she played the torch-singing lead in The Bamboo Blonde, showing off her ability to both vamp and act.

In a Western movie, Deputy Marshal, she co-starred with her first husband, matinee idol Jon Hall. In several of Langford's films she appeared as herself, as in Broadway Melody of 1936 and The Glenn Miller Story (1953). In the latter film, she sang "Chattanooga Choo Choo" with the Modernaires and the movie orchestra.

== World War II ==
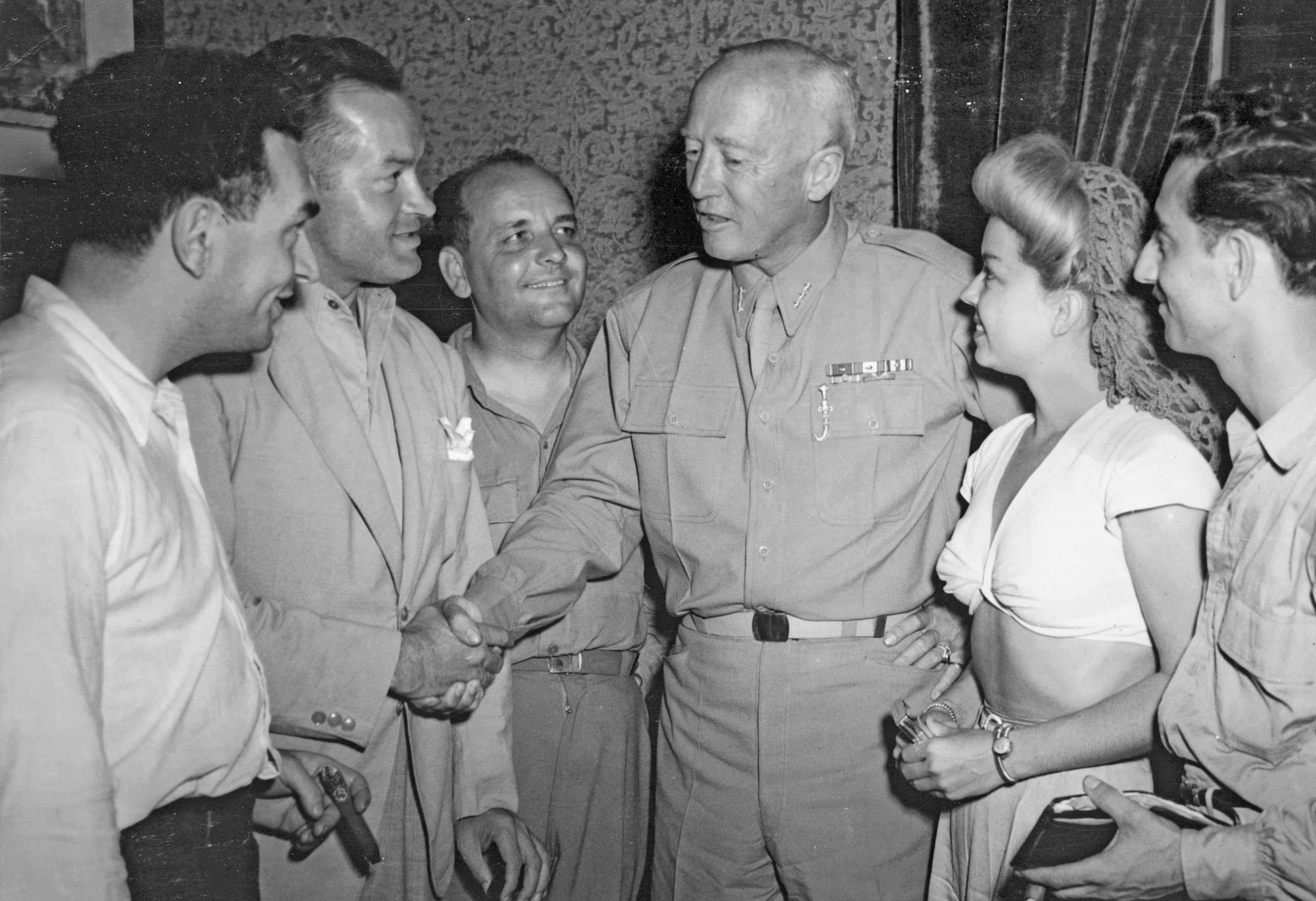
From left to right: Hal Block, Bob Hope, Barney Dean, General George S. Patton, Langford, and Tony Romano in Sicily in August 1943, just three days after Messina had been secured

From 1941, Langford was a regular singer on Bob Hope's The Pepsodent Show when he held his first military entertainment program at March Field in Riverside, California in 1941. The show was so positive, he continued broadcasting from training bases around the country and asked Langford to join him. During World War II, she joined Hope, Jerry Colonna, guitarist Tony Romano, and other performers on USO tours through Europe, North Africa, and the South Pacific, entertaining thousands of GIs throughout the world. During a USO tour in the Pacific theater, she was invited to take a ride in a P-38 fighter plane. During the flight, a Japanese ship was spotted and the joy ride was postponed until the pilot finished strafing the ship.

In his memoir, Don't Shoot! It's Only Me!, Bob Hope recalled how Frances Langford got the biggest laugh he had ever heard. At a USO show in the South Pacific, Langford stood up on a stage to sing before a huge crowd of GIs. When Langford sang the first line of her signature song, "I'm in the Mood for Love," a soldier in the audience stood up and shouted, "You've come to the right place, honey!"

Also, during the war, Langford wrote the weekly "Purple Heart Diary" column for Hearst Newspapers, in which she described her visits to military hospitals to entertain wounded GIs. She used the weekly column as a means of allowing the recovering troops to voice their complaints, and to ask for public support for making sure that the wounded troops received all the supplies and comforts they needed.

Her association with Hope continued into the 1980s. In 1989 she joined him for a USO tour to entertain troops in the Persian Gulf.

== Television ==
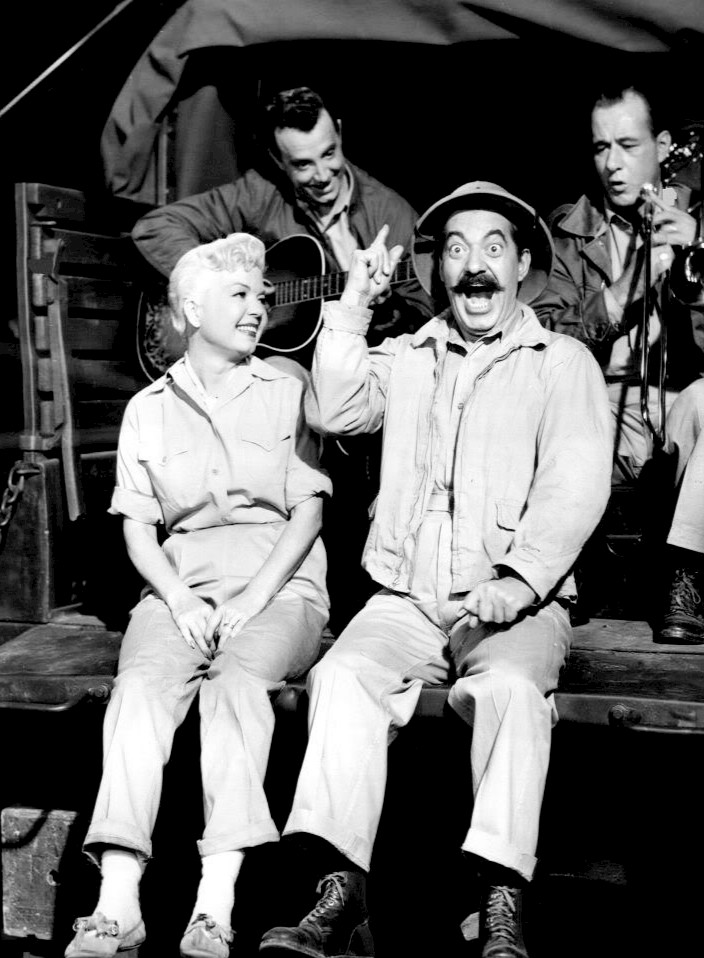
Langford and guest star Jerry Colonna on Frances Langford Presents, 1959

Langford worked for several years in the late 1940s on The Spike Jones Show and starred in a short-lived DuMont variety show Star Time (1950). As a guest on early television shows such as Perry Como and Jackie Gleason she was motivated to venture into television. She was the host of two self-titled variety television programs. She then teamed with Don Ameche for the ABC television program, The Frances Langford/Don Ameche Show (1951), a spin-off of their successful radio series The Bickersons in which the duo played a feuding married couple. Langford was also the host of the NBC musical variety program Frances Langford Presents (1959), which lasted one season, as did a later program The Frances Langford Show (1960).

== Personal life ==
Langford married three times, first to actor Jon Hall (1934–55). In 1948, they donated 20 acres (81,000 m^{2}) of land near her estate in Jensen Beach, Florida to Martin County, which named it Langford Hall Park.

In 1946, Langford was honored by her hometown of Lakeland, Florida, for her work with the United Service Organizations and her music and acting career. The city dedicated the Lake Mirror Promenade as the Frances Langford Promenade.

Langford supported Republican Dwight D. Eisenhower during the 1952 U.S. presidential election.

After leaving Hollywood life, Langford continued with her pastimes of boating and sport fishing. As a nightclub singer in 1955, she married Outboard Marine Corporation president Ralph Evinrude. They lived on her estate in Jensen Beach and they built a Polynesian-themed restaurant and marina on the Indian River named The Frances Langford Outrigger Resort, where she frequently performed. Evinrude died in 1986.

In 1982, Langford's step-granddaughter Frances Julia Slater (from her marriage with Evinrude) was murdered by a group of four men who kidnapped her from a convenience store in Florida. One of the four killers, John Earl Bush, was sentenced to death and executed by the electric chair in 1996, while for the other three perpetrators, one of them had his death sentence commuted to life in 2023, another died in 2023 while on death row and the last was sentenced to life for their respective roles in the murder.

In 1994, Langford married Harold C. Stuart, former assistant secretary for civil affairs of the United States Air Force (1949–1951) under President Harry S. Truman. They spent summers in Georgian Bay, Ontario, Canada, traveling from their home in Florida aboard their 110-foot yacht.

Health problems plagued Langford in the final years of her life, requiring periodic hospital stays. She died at her Jensen Beach home at age 92 from congestive heart failure. According to her wishes, she was cremated, and her ashes were strewn off the coast of Florida near her residence.

== Legacy ==
Langford has two stars on the Hollywood Walk of Fame, one at 1500 Vine Street, which acknowledges her contribution to motion pictures and one at 1525 Vine Street for her work in radio. Both were dedicated on February 8, 1960.

Langford was a supportive member of the Jensen Beach, Florida community and regularly donated money to it. She also supported the Florida Oceanographic Society located on Hutchinson Island. The site's visitor center bears her name and also houses some of her artifacts.

In 2006, the Frances Langford Heart Center, begun by a bequest from her estate, opened at Martin Memorial Hospital in Stuart, Florida.

== Filmography ==
- The Subway Symphony (1932, Short) as Herself
- Rambling 'Round Radio Row #5 (1933, Short) as Herself – Singer
- Every Night at Eight (1935) as Susan Moore
- Broadway Melody of 1936 (1935) as Herself
- Collegiate (1936) as Miss Hay
- Palm Springs (1936) as Joan Smyth
- Sunkist Stars at Palm Springs (1936, Short) as Herself
- Born to Dance (1936) as 'Peppy' Turner
- The Hit Parade (1937) as Ruth Allison
- Hollywood Hotel (1937) as Alice
- Dreaming Out Loud (1940) as Alice
- Too Many Girls (1940) as Eileen Eilers
- Hit Parade of 1941 (1940) as Pat Abbott / Singing voice of Anabelle Potter
- All-American Co-Ed (1941) as Virginia Collinge
- Swing It Soldier (1941) as Patricia Loring / Evelyn Loring Waters
- Picture People No. 4: Stars Day Off (1941, Documentary short) as Herself
- Mississippi Gambler (1942) as Beth Cornell
- Picture People No. 10: Hollywood at Home (1942, Documentary short) as Herself
- Yankee Doodle Dandy (1942) as Nora Bayes
- Hedda Hopper's Hollywood No. 4 (1942, Documentary short) as Herself
- Combat America (1943, Documentary) as Herself
- Follow the Band (1943) as Herself
- Cowboy in Manhattan (1943) as Babs Lee
- This Is the Army (1943) as Herself
- Never a Dull Moment (1943) as Julie Russell
- Career Girl (1944) as Joan Terry
- Memo for Joe (1944, Short documentary) as Herself
- Dixie Jamboree (1944) as Susan Jackson
- Girl Rush (1944) as Flo Daniels
- Radio Stars on Parade (1945) as Sally Baker
- People Are Funny (1946) as Frances Langford
- Screen Snapshots: Hollywood Victory Show (1946, Documentary short) as Herself
- The Bamboo Blonde (1946) as Louise Anderson
- Beat the Band (1947) as Ann Rogers
- Melody Time (1948) as Herself (singing voice, segment: "Once Upon a Wintertime")
- Deputy Marshal (1949) as Janet Masters
- Purple Heart Diary (1951) as Herself
- The Glenn Miller Story (1954) as Herself
-
