= Ralph Evinrude =

American businessman (1907–1986)

- Born: September 27, 1907; Milwaukee, Wisconsin, U.S.
- Died: May 21, 1986 (aged 78); Stuart, Florida, U.S.
- Occupations: Businessmman (Chairman of Outboard Marine Corporation, 1936–1982)
- Children: 2

Ralph S. Evinrude (September 27, 1907 – May 21, 1986) was an American business magnate who was chairman of Outboard Marine Corporation, and the husband of singer and entertainer Frances Langford.

Evinrude was born in Milwaukee, Wisconsin, to Bess and Ole Evinrude. Evinrude's father had emigrated from Norway in 1882 and had developed the first commercially feasible outboard motor, thus creating a new industry and form of recreation. In 1927, Evinrude joined the family firm, Elto Outboard Motor Company after two years at the University of Wisconsin–Madison. Ole Evinrude died on July 12, 1934, and Ralph Evinrude took over running the company. In 1936, Elto Outboard Motor Company merged with Waukegan, Illinois-based Johnson Motor Company to form Outboard Marine Corporation (OMC).

In 1936, the board of directors of OMC elected Evinrude president and director. In 1953, he was elected vice-chairman of the board and chairman of OMC's Executive Committee. He became chairman of OMC in 1963. During his 55-year career in the family business, Evinrude collaborated with manufacturing giants such as Milwaukee based Briggs & Stratton, and expanded the company's product line to include boats, lawnmowers, snowmobiles, and chain saws, and expanded operations worldwide. In 1982 when Evinrude retired as chairman, OMC had more than 9,000 persons employed in operations throughout the world. OMC has a test center in Stuart, Florida which bears his name.

Evinrude was married 3 times. His first wife, Marion Armitage, died. Ralph and Marion had two children: Thomas Armitage Evinrude (June 13, 1932 – October 4, 2023) and Sally Evinrude (born 1935/1936). Evinrude married his second wife, Joan "Bobbe" Everett in Lake Forest, Illinois, in December 1951. In 1955, shortly after his divorce from his second wife, Evinrude married actress/singer Frances Langford and moved to her estate in Jensen Beach, Florida. They shared interests in business and boating and spent much of their time aboard their 118-foot (36 m) yacht Chanticleer. They opened a resort in Jensen Beach called The Outrigger. Evinrude and Langford also maintained a cottage on a small island at the east end of Baie Fine, a fjord on the north shore of Georgian Bay, in Lake Huron, in what is now Killarney Provincial Park in Ontario, Canada. Chanticleer was often seen tied up at the island during the summer.

In 1982, Evinrude's granddaughter Frances Julia Slater was kidnapped and murdered by four men while working at a convenience store in Florida. One of the four killers, John Earl Bush, was sentenced to death and executed by the electric chair in 1996, while for the rest, one died on death row in 2023 before he could be executed, another had his death sentence commuted to life and the last was sentenced to life in prison.

During his later working years and during retirement, Evinrude supported a wide variety of philanthropic activities. Some of his interests focused on Florida and the marine industry, while others benefited Milwaukee-area hospitals, institutions of higher education and the arts.

Evinrude died at Martin Memorial Hospital in Stuart, Florida, at the age of 78.
