= Roger Jenkins =

Roger Jenkins may refer to:

- Roger Jenkins (ice hockey) (1911–1994), ice hockey player
- Roger Jenkins (banker) (born 1955), formerly of Barclays Capital
- Roger Jenkins, business school dean, see Farmer School of Business
- Roger Jenkins (director) (1931–2022), British theatre and television director
- Roger Jenkins (boat racer) (1940–2021), British powerboat racer
