= Ole Evinrude =

American inventor

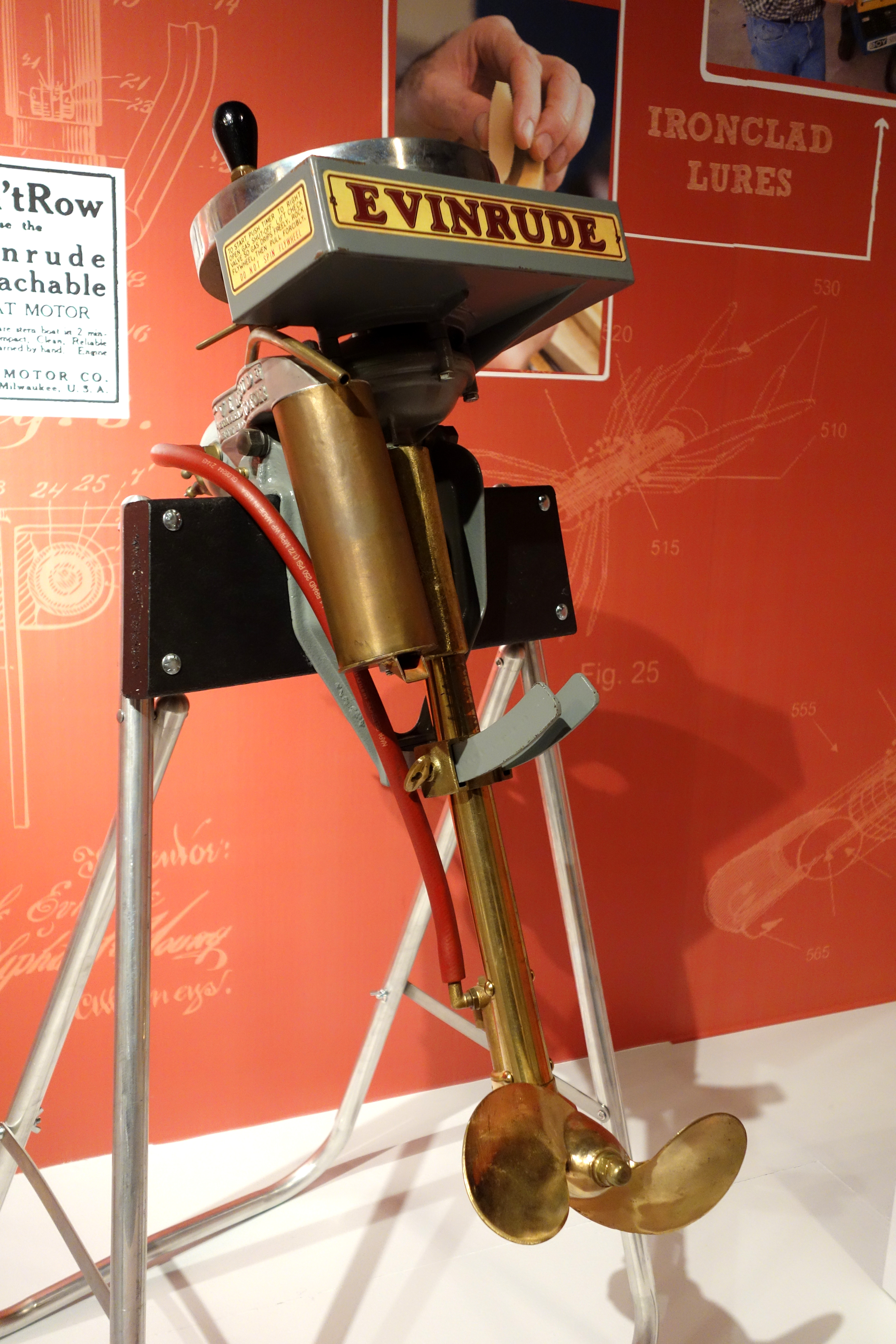
- Evinrude Outboard Motor
- Born: Ole Andreassen Aaslundeie; 19 April 1877; Hunndalen, Norway
- Died: 12 July 1934 (aged 57); Milwaukee, Wisconsin
- Resting place: Pinelawn Cemetery in Milwaukee, Wisconsin
- Known for: Evinrude Outboard Motor

Ole Evinrude, born Ole Andreassen Aaslundeie (April 19, 1877 – July 12, 1934) was a Norwegian-American entrepreneur, known for the invention of the first outboard motor with practical commercial application.

== Biography ==
Ole Evinrude was born in Hunndalen in Vardal Municipality (now part of Gjøvik Municipality), in Christians amt (county), Norway. The Evinrude surname, which he adopted in the United States, is an estate name from the Evenrud farm in Vestre Toten Municipality, where his mother was born. In October 1881, his father emigrated to America, followed the next year by Evinrude, his mother and two siblings. Three additional siblings were born in America. The family settled on a farm near Lake Ripley in Cambridge, Wisconsin and Evinrude first tried out his motor on that lake. At age sixteen, Evinrude went to Madison, where he worked in machinery stores and studied engineering on his own. He became a machinist while working at various machine tool firms in Milwaukee, Pittsburgh, and Chicago.

In 1900, Evinrude co-founded the custom engine firm Clemick & Evinrude. In 1907, he invented the first practical and reliable outboard motor, which was built of steel and brass, and had a crank on the flywheel to start the two-cycle engine. In 1907 he had built his first gasoline-powered outboard motor, and two years later, Evinrude Motor Company was founded in Milwaukee. The simplest type of engine the company produced was a 2-stroke internal combustion engine that was powered by a mixture of gasoline and oil.

Evinrude reported that his invention was inspired by rowing a boat on Okauchee Lake, a small lake outside Milwaukee, Wisconsin, on a hot day to get ice cream for his girlfriend, Bess. By 1912, the firm employed 300 workers. Evinrude let two motorcycle-mad teens tinker in his Milwaukee-based machine shop; one was named Arthur Davidson, who went on to Harley-Davidson motorcycle fame, also based in Milwaukee. Ole Evinrude formed Evinrude Outboard Motors, which he sold in 1913 in order to look after his sick wife.

In 1919, Evinrude invented a more efficient and lighter two-cylinder motor. Having sold his part in Clemick & Evinrude, he founded ELTO or the Elto Outboard Motor Company. (ELTO was an acronym for "Evinrude Light Twin Outboard".) Although Elto faced stiff competition from other companies, such as the Johnson Motor Company of South Bend, Indiana, Evinrude's company survived through acquisitions, eventually forming the Outboard Marine Corporation.

His wife Bess died in 1933, at only 48 years old, and Ole Evinrude died the following year, 57 years old. They were both buried at Pinelawn Cemetery in Milwaukee, Wisconsin. After Evinrude died, his son, Ralph Evinrude, took over day-to-day management of the company, eventually rising to chairman of the board. The company is now called Evinrude Outboard Motors, and is owned by Bombardier Recreational Products.
