= Roger Jenkins (boat racer) =

Welsh powerboat racer (1940–2021)

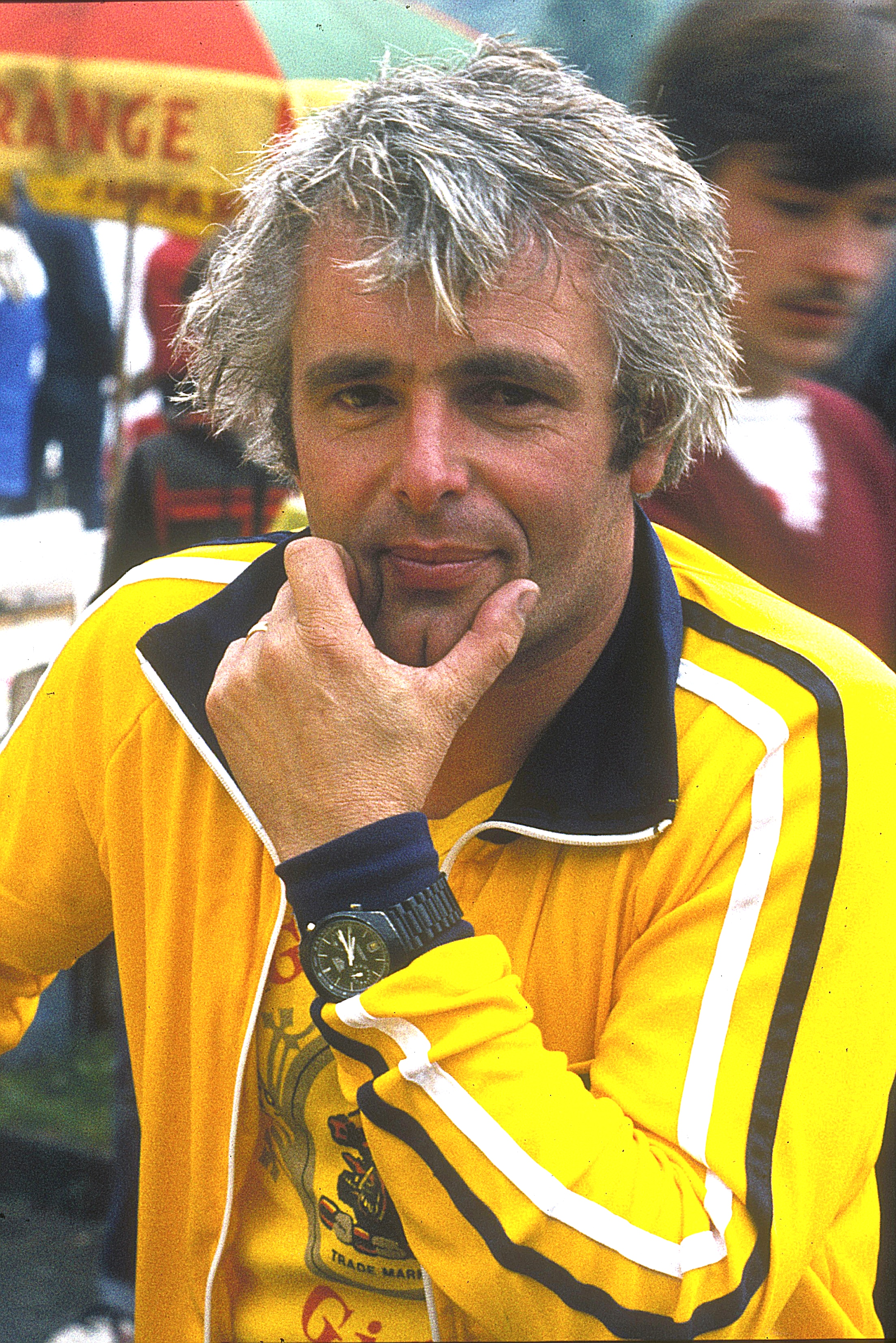
- Nationality: British
- Born: Roger Jenkins; 8 August 1940 Caerleon, Monmouthshire, Wales
- Died: 30 October 2021 (aged 81) Mojacar, Spain

F1 Powerboat World Championship
- Years active: 1981-1984
- Best finish: 1st in 1982

Championship titles
- 1982: F1 Powerboat World Championship

Roger Jenkins (8 August 1940 – 30 October 2021) was a British and Welsh powerboat racer, and the winner of the 1982 John Player Special F1 Powerboat World Championship.

== Life and career ==
Jenkins began his boating career in 1965. He won a huge number of titles, including the F3 World Sprint Championship and the Paris Six Hours. Then he won the biggest title in his career so far, the JPS Formula 1 championship in 1982. In August 1984 he retired from racing after the Liege Grand Prix that ended in the death of his friend and fellow driver Tom Percival.

Jenkins died from heart failure in Mojacar, on 30 October 2021, at the age 81.
