= Renato Molinari =

Italian powerboat racer (1946–2024)

- Born: 27 February 1946 Nesso, Italy
- Died: September 2024 (aged 78)

F1 Powerboat World Championship career
- Debut season: 1981
- Best finish: 1st in 1981

Championship titles
- 1981, 1983, 1984: F1 Powerboat World Championship

Renato Molinari (27 February 1946 – September 2024) was an Italian powerboat racer and the inaugural winner of the John Player Special F1 Powerboat World Championship in 1981, and won titles again in 1983 and 1984. In addition to this success, Molinari was an 18-time World Champion (in different categories); 11-time European Champion (in different categories), 4-time winner of the Rouen 24 hours, 4-time winner of the Paris 6 hours; twice winner of the Parker Enduro and 3-time winner of the Berlin 6 hours.

Renato and his father, Angelo Molinari, were instrumental in the inaugural design and building of the outboard-powered Tunnel race boats in the mid-1960s. The wooden boats from Como, Italy, were frontrunners in the birth and establishment of the Formula One Race Boats.

== Life and career ==
Molinari was born on 27 February 1946. He began his boating career in 1964, and won the Formula 1 championship in 1981, 1983 and 1984. Molinari died in September 2024, at the age of 78.
