= Every Night at Eight =

1935 film by Raoul Walsh

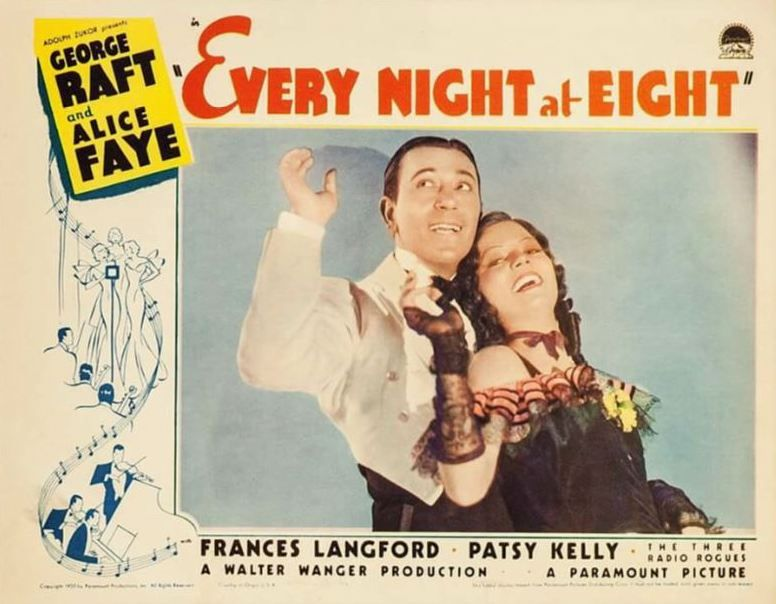
- Directed by: Raoul Walsh
- Written by: C. Graham Barker
- Based on: story "Three on a Mike" by Stanley Garvey
- Produced by: Walter Wanger
- Starring: George Raft; Alice Faye; Patsy Kelly; Frances Langford
- Edited by: W. Donn Hayes
- Music by: Frederick Hollander; Paul Mertz; Clifford Vaughan
- Production company: Walter Wanger Productions
- Distributed by: Paramount Pictures
- Release date: August 2, 1935
- Running time: 80 minutes
- Country: United States
- Language: English
- Budget: $266,956
- Box office: $507,117

Every Night at Eight is a 1935 American musical comedy film starring George Raft and Alice Faye and made by Walter Wanger Productions Inc. and Paramount Pictures. It was directed by Raoul Walsh and produced by Walter Wanger from a screenplay by C. Graham Baker, Bert Hanlon and Gene Towne based on the story Three On a Mike by Stanley Garvey.

The song "I'm in the Mood for Love" was introduced in this film by Frances Langford. "I Feel a Song Coming On" was performed by Harry Barris and a band and reprised by Alice Faye, Frances Langford and Patsy Kelly, and also sung by James Miller with chorus.

Pioneer scat singer and songwriter Harry Barris, formerly of Paul Whiteman's Rhythm Boys along with Bing Crosby and Al Rinker, has a small role as "Harry."

== Plot ==
The film involves a trio of young female singers trying to break into show business. Three young women working in an agency named Dixie Foley, Daphne O' Connor and Susan Moore have built a singing trio. They want to 'lease' the Dictaphone of their boss, Mr. Huxley to make a record of their singing, but they are caught and fired. When they are not able to pay their rent any longer, they decide to try their luck on an amateur contest at a radio station, hosted by a Major Bowes-type named Colonel Dave. Several talents approach the microphone, including The Radio Rogues, an Italian who sings opera terribly, and an elderly chicken impersonator aptly named Henrietta.

Due to lack of food, Susan becomes unconscious while singing and the contest is won by a blue-collar big band led by Tops Cardona. They become involved with Tops after he is impressed by Susan's singing at a café run by a German named Joe Schmidt. Tops offers them a job with his band at the radio station. They accept, are christened The Swanee Sisters by Tops to give them a southern flavor, and he buys them matching outfits. Tops and the girls soon become a nationwide hit once they land a sponsor (who happens to be their old boss, Mr. Huxley), but after a while, they grow tired of working constantly and not having any fun, and leave the band indefinitely. Daphne insists they attend a party (in the furs Tops bought for them), leaving Tops to fend for himself.

They accept an invitation to appear at a party held on a yacht by a Mrs. Reginald Herring-Smythe. After meeting several unsavory rich people at the soiree, and feeling a bit sour after mixing with the "creme de la creme", they adjourn to an anteroom with a radio in it. Tops is on the air without them, and he tells everyone listening in that they are absent and how much he misses them, hoping they will to return to him. The girls soon realize they can't go on without him and return to the band.

== Cast ==
- George Raft as Tops Cardona
- Alice Faye as Dixie Foley
- Patsy Kelly as Daphne O'Connor
- Frances Langford as Susan Moore
- Walter Catlett as the Master of Ceremonies (M.C.)
- Herman Bing as Joe Schmidt
- John Dilson as Huxley
- Louise Carver as Mrs. Snyder
- Claud Allister as Mr. Vernon
- Harry Holman as Col. Ratchfield
- Florence Gill as Henrietta
- Harry Barris as Harry
- Claudia Coleman as Mrs. Reginald Herring-Smythe

== Production ==
Alice Faye was cast in April 1935. Filming began the following month. It was completed by the end of June.

== Songs ==
All songs with music by Jimmy McHugh, and lyrics by Dorothy Fields and George Oppenheimer except where noted.

- "Take It Easy"
- "Speaking Confidentially"
- "Then You've Never Been Blue" (Ted Fio Rito/Frances Langford/Sam M. Lewis)
- "Every Night at Eight"
- "Il Bacio
- "I Feel a Song Coming On"
- "I'm in the Mood For Love"

== Reception ==
The film made a profit of $148,782.

Filmink said Raft was "very animated".
