= Rick Frost =

- Nationality: British
- Born: 13 April 1944 (age 82)

F1 Powerboat World Championship
- Years active: 1981-??

Championship titles
- 1980 1982: European F4 Sprint Championship; Aspen F3 World Series

Rick Frost (born 13 April 1944) is a British and English former powerboat racer. He began his boating career in 1980 and competed in the first season of the F1 Powerboat World Championship in 1981. He was the 1980 European F4 Sprint Champion and the 1982 World Champion in the Aspen F3 World Series.
