= Bob Spalding =

- Nationality: British
- Born: Robert Fiske Spalding; 18 April 1941 Buenos Aires, Argentina
- Died: 8 December 1997 (aged 56) Cambridge, Cambridgeshire, England

F1 Powerboat World Championship
- Years active: 1981-1985
- Best finish: 1st in 1990

Championship titles
- 1985: F1 Powerboat World Championship

Robert Fiske "Bob" Spalding (18 April 1941 – 8 December 1997) was a British powerboat racer. He was born in Argentina to British parents and was a former F1 Powerboat World Champion and 4 times winner of the Paris six-hour.

Spalding began his boating career in 1961. In 1985, he won the F1 Powerboat World Championship, but did not defend his title the next season after having to retire following head injuries as a result of crashing in the Seville Grand Prix.
