= Tom Percival =

British powerboat racer (1943–1984)

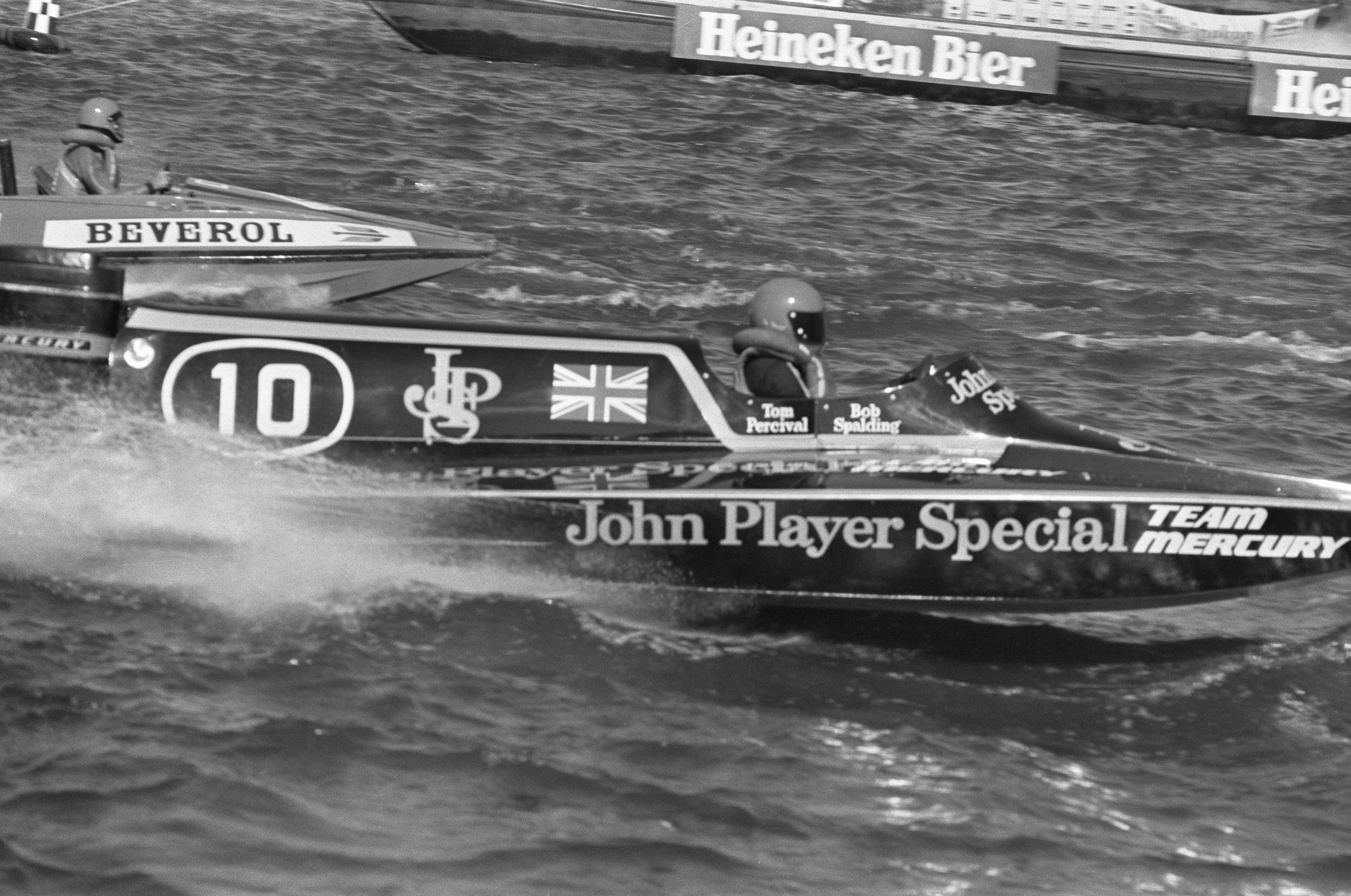
- Percival (in boat 10) in 1975.
- Nationality: British
- Born: Thomas Colin Percival; 28 March 1943 North Walsham, Norfolk, England
- Died: 20 August 1984 (aged 41) Liège, Belgium

JPS F1 Powerboat World Championship
- Years active: 1981-1984
- Best finish: 3rd in 1982, 1983

Championship titles
- 1978 1976, 1977: F1 World Championship; Paris six-hour Enduro

Thomas Colin Percival (28 March 1943 – 20 August 1984) was a British powerboat racer.

== Career ==
Percival was educated at Gresham's School. He began his powerboat racing career in 1964, and won the Formula 1 (OZ) championship in 1978. He was also a twice winner of the Paris Six Hour Enduro. He was twice the Canon European Series champion, in 1976 and 1978.

During his career, he won over two hundred trophies. As of 2022, he was still the holder of the lap record for Oulton Broad.

=== Death ===
Percival died in an accident during the 7th round of the 1984 F1 Powerboat World Championship in Liège, Belgium. After he collided with another boat, Percival, who had received severe head injuries was taken to Liège Hospital, but then lapsed into a coma and died some hours later on Monday morning.

== Personal life ==
Percival's career outside sport was as a boat dealer, based in Norfolk. He was married to Gilly, and they had a son, Guy, and a daughter, Katie, aged 16 and 14 respectively at the time of his death.
