= Evinrude Outboard Motors =

American boat motor company, 1907–2020

Evinrude
- Type: Subsidiary
- Founded: 1907; 119 years ago
- Defunct: 2020
- Headquarters: Sturtevant, Wisconsin, United States & Montreal, Quebec, Canada
- Key people: Ole Evinrude
- Products: Outboard motor
- Parent: BRP (2000–2020); OMC (1935–2000)
- Website: www.evinrude.com

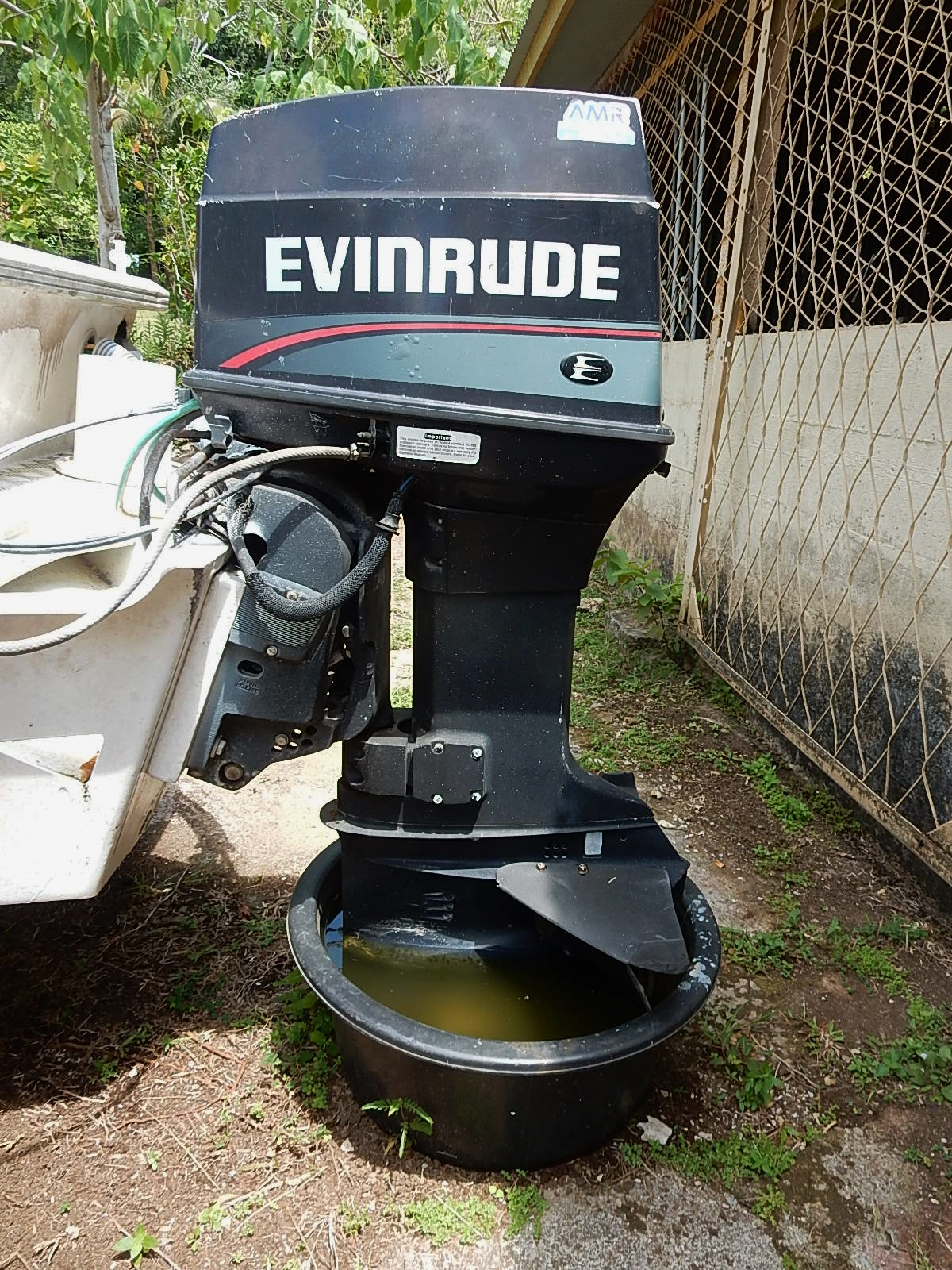

Evinrude Outboard Motors was an American company that built a major brand of two-stroke outboard motors for boats. Founded by Ole Evinrude in Milwaukee, Wisconsin, in 1907, it was owned from 1935 by the publicly traded Outboard Marine Corporation (OMC) until its bankruptcy in 2000. It was subsequently sold to Canadian-based Bombardier Recreational Products who ended all Evinrude production in May 2020 after divestiture of its in-house outboard engine production.

== Product ==
Evinrude produced two-stroke direct-injected engines ranging from 4 hp (3.0 kW) to a 3.6L V8 250HP & 300 HP in 1985 and change to 4.0L V8 250 HP & 300 HP in 1986 onward to the end of the production of the V8 configuration. They used carburetors until the late 1990s when EPA clean air regulations mandated new technologies. OMC partnered with FICHT of Germany to introduce direct injection. Extensive and thorough durability testing took place to assess the rigor and longevity of the design but the first design did not pass testing standards.

Initial production of the first design started prior to another round of EPA regulations. At the beginning, the company tried retrofitting the previous design in order to bring the motors up to the new standards. These modifications were not carefully engineered or designed and caused significant engine failures, most notably the powerhead failure. This eventually resulted in a recall of that generation of motors. The losses on these motors, the loss of reputation and the surge of competition from Japan and Mercury pushed the company into bankruptcy in 2000.

In 2001, Bombardier acquired the Evinrude and Johnson Outboards brands; the FICHT technology was re-engineered into E-TEC direct injection. This improved fuel efficiency and reduced emissions, oil consumption, noise levels and maintenance needs. This is due in part to a pinpoint oiling system that only applies oil to the necessary components, unlike the original two-stroke motors. Evinrude E-TEC was the first outboard engine technology to win the US Environmental Protection Agency's 2004 Clean Air Excellence Award which recognizes low emission levels.

According to the EPA, it is also recognized as acceptable for use by the European Union. "Compared to a similar 2004 four-stroke engine, carbon monoxide emissions with Evinrude E-TEC are typically 30 to 50 percent lower; and at idle are lower by a factor of 50 to 100 times. In addition, Evinrude E-TEC emits 30 to 40 percent less total particulate matter on a weight basis than a similar “ultra-low emissions” four-stroke outboard. Furthermore, oxides of nitrogen and hydrocarbon emissions for Evinrude E-TEC are similar, if not lower, than a four-stroke outboard. There are no oil changes with this engine, as well as no belts, and no valve or throttle linkage adjustments. This makes Evinrude E-TEC engines easier to own than comparable four-stroke engines. In addition, numerous advancements combine to create the Evinrude E-TEC quiet signature sound including an exclusive idle air bypass circuit."

All modern Evinrude motors were built and assembled in Sturtevant, Wisconsin, south of Milwaukee.

== History ==
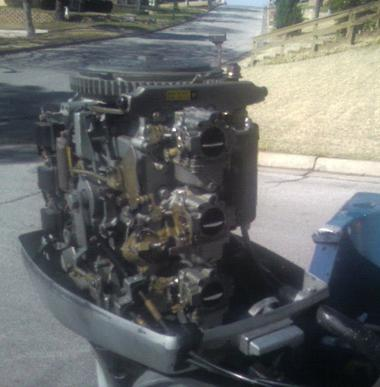
1979 Evinrude 70 HP outboard, cowling and air cleaner removed, exposing its shift/throttle/spark advance linkages, flywheel, and three carburetors

Ole Evinrude was born in Gjøvik, Norway on April 19, 1877; five years later, his family emigrated to the United States, settling near Cambridge, Wisconsin. Interested in mechanics from an early age, Evinrude became an apprentice machinist at age 16 and eventually a master pattern maker, as well.

Along with a growing number of people at the turn of the century, Ole Evinrude was fascinated by the potential of the newly developed internal combustion engine, and he set up a firm to build small engines. The idea for Ole Evinrude's invention, a detachable internal-combustion engine mounted on outboard brackets or on the stern of a boat, first took root in the early 1900s. A pattern maker by trade, Ole Evinrude built his first outboard motor in 1907. To this day, outboard motors employ basically the same technology: a vertical crankshaft, horizontal flywheels, and set of bevel gears, but modern motors propel boats faster than the 1907 version (150 mph versus 5 mph).

While Evinrude concentrated on the mechanical and engineering aspects of the new firm, he entrusted the bookkeeping and business end of the firm to his assistant, Bessie Cary. The story surrounding Evinrude's invention of the outboard boat engine revolves around a picnic that Cary and Evinrude enjoyed on Okauchee Lake, in the lake country west of Milwaukee, two and one-half miles from shore. Cary expressed a desire for a dish of ice cream and Evinrude rowed back to shore for it. Of course, the ice cream was melted by the time he returned, but Evinrude, inspired by the incident, was determined to design an engine that would replace the oar as a means of boat propulsion.

Cary and Evinrude were married in 1906. In 1907, Evinrude founded Evinrude Motors in Milwaukee. The firm immediately began to develop its first outboard motor, a one-cylinder, 1.5 hp (1.1 kW) model, which became an instant success upon its introduction in 1909.

Because of Bessie's poor health, the Evinrudes sold their company in 1913, and Ole agreed to not re-enter the outboard motor business for five years. His inventive mind kept busy, however, and during his "retirement", he devised a much-improved, two-cylinder outboard engine. In 1921 he and Bessie formed the ELTO Outboard Motor Company (ELTO standing for Evinrude's Light Twin Outboard). This new outboard engine was also very successful, and in 1929 the ELTO company merged with the original Evinrude company (since renamed the Outboard Marine Corporation) and the Lockwood Motor Company, with Evinrude the president of this new company.

Bessie, who had retired in 1928 for health reasons, died in 1933 in Milwaukee. Ole Evinrude died the following year on July 12 in Milwaukee, and the company was taken over by their son, Ralph. In 1936 the Evinrude company merged with the Johnson Motor Company to form the Outboard Marine Corporation. During World War II the company manufactured motors for various types of military marine craft.

In the 1930s and 1940s, 4-60 engines were used in midgets racers. These 59.4 cu in (973 cc) Four 4 cylinder, water-cooled horizontally opposed engines ran on special racing fuel: 82% methanol, 10% toluene or benzol, and 8% castor oil (which was available in 5 US gal (19 L; 4.2 imp gal) cans from drug stores), plus tetraethyllead (also available in drug stores) to avoid engine knock. They would rev close to 8,000 rpm and could produce 80 hp (60 kW), close to 1 horsepower per pound (0.6 kW/kg) of engine weight.

OMC declared chapter 11 bankruptcy in 2000 and its assets were subsequently acquired by Bombardier Recreational Products, which continued to build Evinrude branded outboard motors.

On May 27, 2020, BRP announced that they would be retiring the Evinrude brand and would exit the outboard boat motor market, in favor of manufacturing recreational boats. BRP also announced a partnership with what it termed "market leader" Mercury Marine to supply power packages to their craft.

According to BRP's press release announcing the Evinrude discontinuation, “'Our outboard engines business has been greatly impacted by COVID-19, obliging us to discontinue production of our outboard motors immediately. This business segment had already been facing some challenges and the impact from the current context has forced our hand,' said José Boisjoli, President and CEO of BRP. 'We will concentrate our efforts on new and innovative technologies and on the development of our boat companies, where we continue to see a lot of potential to transform the on-water experience for consumers,' he added.”

BRP claimed it "will continue to supply customers and our dealer network service parts and will honour our manufacturer limited warranties, plus offer select programs to manage inventory." A statement it followed with an extended disclaimer on "Forward Looking Statements" disavowing any obligation to comply with what it said.

The discontinuation occurred in spite of modern Evinrude E-TEC engines being among the lowest emission and highest power-to-weight ratio outboards produced, in large " due to a technological choice not understood by boaters", according to a yachting trade magazine, and reflected in the contrast between the superior environmental performance of the Evinrude E-TEC engine versus four-stroke engine alternatives, incorrectly perceived as more environmentally friendly. The Evinrude E-TEC was the first outboard engine technology to win the US Environmental Protection Agency's Clean Air Excellence Award, which recognizes low emission levels. According to the EPA, when compared to a similar four-stroke engine at the time of the award, carbon monoxide emissions with Evinrude E-TEC were typically 30 to 50 percent lower; and at idle are lower by a factor of 50 to 100 times. In addition, Evinrude E-TEC emit 30 to 40 percent less total particulate matter on a weight basis than a similar “ultra-low emissions” four-stroke outboard. Furthermore, oxides of nitrogen and hydrocarbon emissions for Evinrude E-TEC are similar to, if not lower than, a four-stroke outboard.

Evinrude's name continued not only on many an outboard motor but also by the presentation of the Ole Evinrude Award. Given annually between 1955 and 1986 by the New York Boat Show, it was presented in recognition of an individual's contributions to the growth of recreational boating. It also gained worldwide popular fame when the name of a character in the animated feature film, The Rescuers echoed that of the company.

== Racing history ==
Evinrude, and its subsidiary Johnson, made race outboards throughout the years sold through a small web of dealers through special inquiry. Most people know of the infamous Evinrude/Johnson V8 racing engine; which currently holds the world outboard speed record coming in at 176.556 MPH- taken from an average of three laps. Some of these laps exceeded 180 MPH, but couldn't be counted by themselves as it had to be an average taken from 3 laps. they made an EFI (electronic fuel injection) model (Evinrude F1-ES, Johnson F1-JS), as well as a carbureted model (Johnson OZF-JS). These outboards dominated boat racing in the mid-1980s, but went away as parts became hard to find, and they no longer meet the APBA (American Power Boat Association) class requirements to compete. Some independent shops such as Monty Racing do modify OMC V8 engines to be competitive in drag racing.

Evinrude/Johnson APBA Class A Engines: in the mid-1980s OMC created the Evinrude EKT-11C, and the Johnson JKT-11C. These were 9.9 outboards fitted with racing gearcases, props, and were factory tuned to be compliant with the APBA's Class A, as people at the time had to modify their Evinrudes/Johnsons to be competitive. also a low number of these were made, and only available through a select set of dealers worldwide. These can still be spotted from time to time at vintage outboard races, or smaller racing organizations that still allow them. especially since way more parts are available, as they were not all that different from a consumer 9.9.

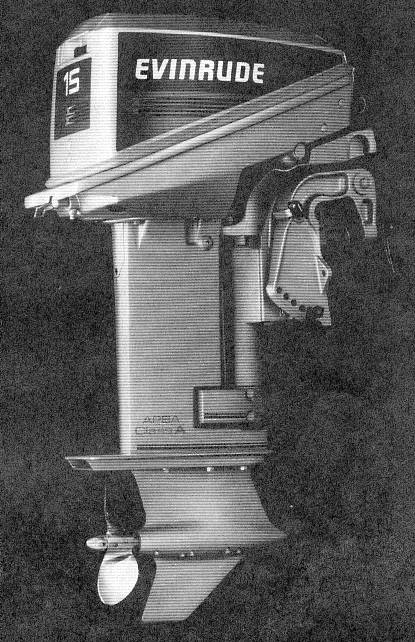
Evinrude APBA class A motor in an OMC catalogue

Evinrude/Johnson SST45: These engines were made to comply with the APBA's SST45 Class, utilizing a factory tuned 2 cylinder engine, using the block from the 40/48SPL/50/55 engine family, also featuring a racing gearcase, and cable steering bars. These outboards still race today with the APBA, and parts for them are still around as they aren't that much different from a stock 40, and some shops remanufacture hard to come-by parts. (Evinrude ERTE-12R, ERT-12R/Johnson JRTE-12R, JRT-12R)

Evinrude/Johnson SST60: These engines were made to comply with the APBA's SST60 Class, running about 56.1 cubic inches, these motors run the classic OMC Loop-Charged 3 cylinder engine, with a racing gearcase, and cable steering arms. The model number for this engine is SSTE-14M. these engines are still raced today in the APBA to this day. also, Evinrude/Johnson made this style engine for the APBA Formula 3 Class, but unlike the SST60, OMC stepped it up a notch when it came to engine tuning, and added a special light-weight flywheel, two-barrel carbs for each cylinder, different reed valves, special intake manifold, and shorter midsection. (Evinrude/Johnson FR-31-M) Along with the Evinrude/Johnson Formula 3 engines, there was the much older Evinrude CC and the Johnson SR. Both Loop-Charged 3 cylinders that ran in the 70s to the early 80s. The model number for those engines is FR-19S.

Evinrude/Johnson SST100: These engines were made to race in the APBA SST100 class, utilizing the OMC 90 degree V4 engine, race gearcase, cable steering arms, and a special extra short midsection, and were factory tuned. these motors are not spotted much due to their class ending, and presumably being replaced by the SST120 class, no longer allowing the SST100. Plus, these motors were slightly more unique and because of that parts are harder to find. (Evinrude/Johnson SST100-15B)

Evinrude/Johnson F1 V6: in the late 70s and early 80s, before the infamous OMC V8 could run, the V6's walked. OMC made the Evinrude CCC, and Johnson RS (Racing Special) engines to race in the F1 class of the APBA. This was in the earlier days of OMC's F1 journey, and they were not doing so good against Mercury at the time, and OMC made these outboards sold in limited quantities to racers around the US. As OMC raced these they raced another outboard in the F1 class that isn't talked about enough today, mentioned in the paragraph below. These OMC V6's were outfitted with special racing gear cases, two barrel carbs, cable steering bars for racing, an extra short midsection, and tuned from the factory. the model number for this engine is NR-19S. This engine is no longer raced today as it has been obsolete for years, and parts are very hard to find for them, and the few that are in existence today are in museums or private collections.

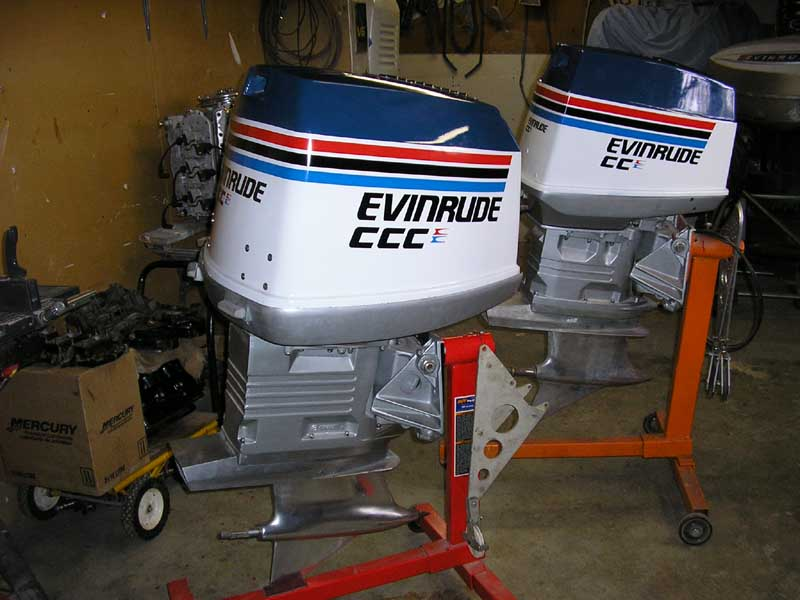
Evinrude CCC racing outboards in a garage.

Evinrude/Johnson F1 Rotary Outboards: in the 1970s OMC experimented with the potential of the Rotary engine as they already bought and installed them in snowmobiles they made, thinking they could have potential in the world of boating. They licensed the design rights for the rotary engine from NSU and Curtis-Wright and engineered them to be liquid cooled for use on the water. They ultimately decided that they were never going to sell rotaries for the consumer market, but went further on designing it due to OMC not doing well in the race circuit against Mercury, and since the rotary engine could go to high RPMs they decided to turn it into a race motor. After many long hours they finally built the OMC 4-Rotor racing engine and it made over 270 horsepower on their dynamometer at OMC Waukegan. It had 4 single-barrel carburetors, a racing gearcase, and the midsection was built into the "tub" of the engine. One thing that was unique was that it had two impellers; one for the engine, and one for the exhaust, as the engineers were afraid the hot rotary exhaust would melt the aluminum in the midsection. It also had cable steering arms for racing of course. They only raced them for a few years as they encountered many problems usually with the engine's crankshaft. Although once someone sabotaged their engines by loosening the nuts on the carburetors, creating an incredibly lean mixture that burnt up the engines. But remarkably they lasted way longer than a normal outboard would on that lean mixture. They did end up accomplishing their mission of dominating mercury and their V6 engines, and once they got Mercury so mad that their executives watching the race left and flew back to their headquarters mid race. Only a few rotaries were ever completed and only team Evinrude and Johnson ever raced them, and the few that still exist are in private collections, and one is in BRP Sturtevant's front office.

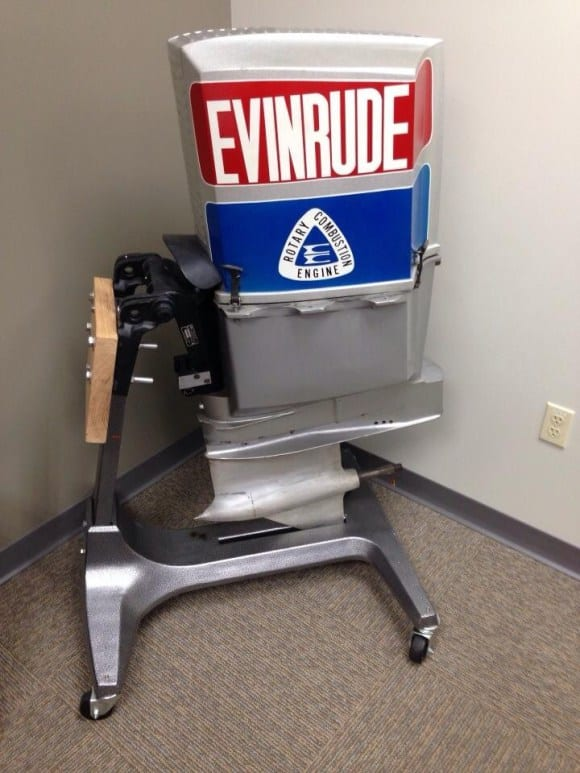
Evinrude Rotary race engine in BRP Sturtevant
