= Johnson Outboards =

American manufacturer

Johnson Outboards was an American manufacturer of outboard motors founded by the four brothers Louis, Harry, Julius and Clarence Johnson.

== History ==
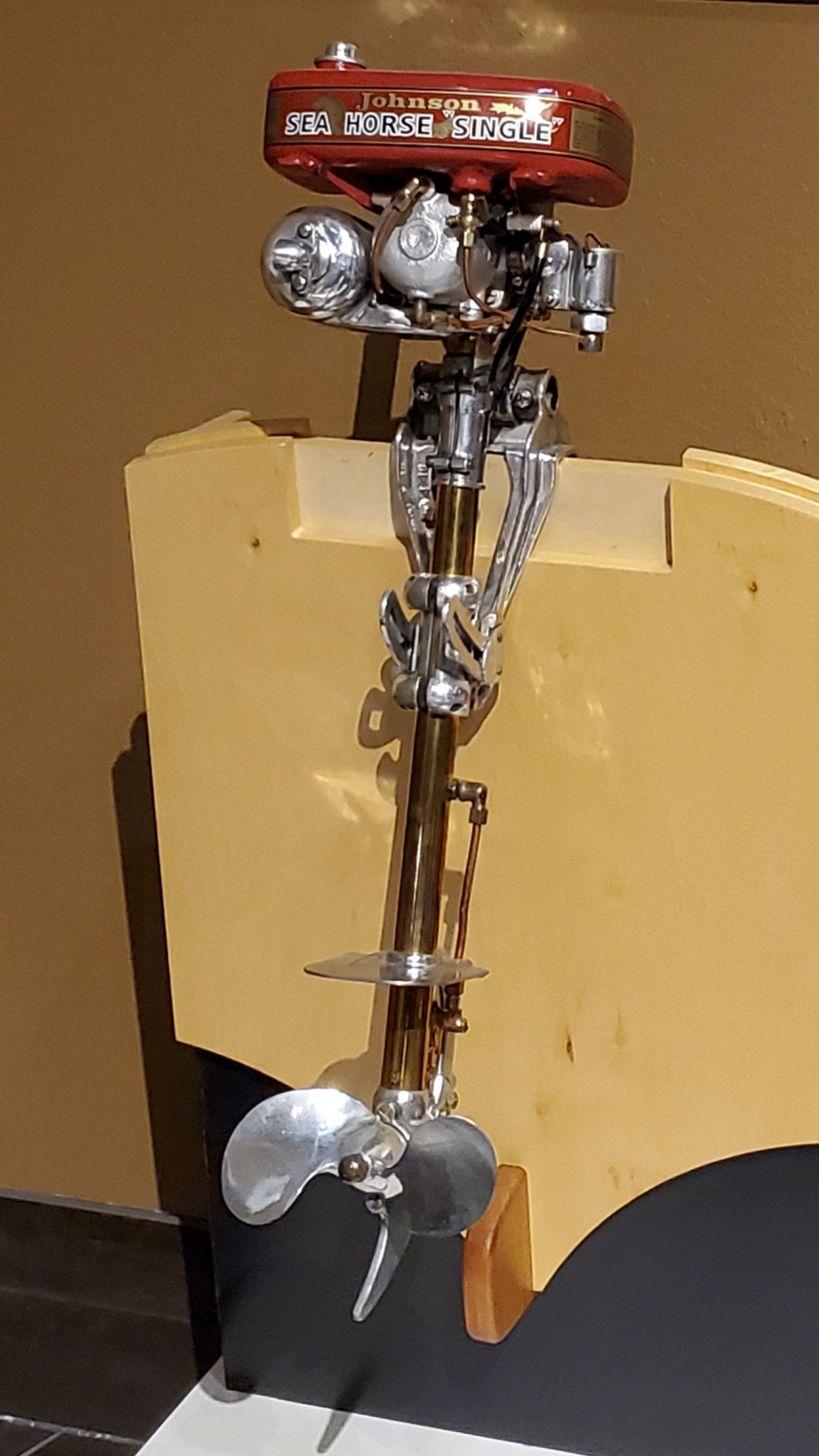
1927 Johnson Seahorse outboard motor at the Tellus Science Museum

The original company that made Johnson inboard motors and outboard motors was the Johnson Brothers Motor Company of Terre Haute, Indiana, United States.

They started building inboard 2-stroke marine engines in 1903 in a barn behind the house, along with matching boats. By 1908, they were making V4, V6, V8, and V12 aircraft and marine engines. In 1910, they built the first U.S. monoplane to exhibit their aircraft engines. By 1912, their V-12 was making 180 hp, when disaster struck the factory. Torrential rain, followed by flooding and a direct hit from a tornado, wiped it all out, drawings, machinery, and everything else. The brothers relocated to South Bend, Indiana and then Waukegan, Illinois.

Starting in 1922, they designed and built Johnson Outboard Motors, a radical new, lightweight outboard made largely of aluminum. By the mid-1920s, they surpassed Evinrude in sales, and dominated the outboard racing scene.

In 1928, the brothers bought the Birmingham Automotive Company site in Peterborough, Ontario and established the Canadian Johnson Motor Company Ltd. By 1931 they produced cedar strip hulls at their Canadian facility. The Peterborough factory was at the time 30,000 square feet in extent and had 17 employees. It was an assembly plant for American-produced parts.

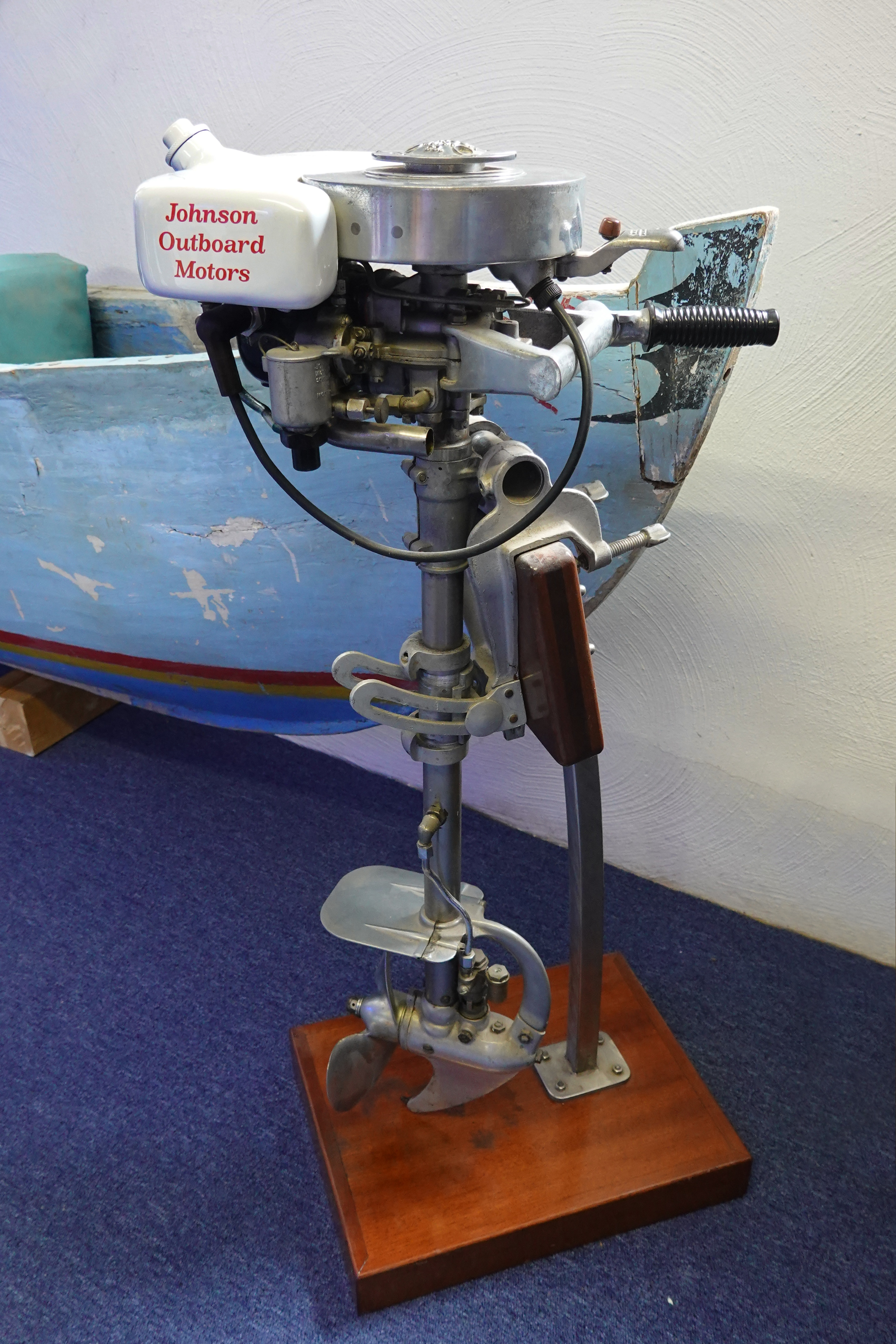
Johnson Seahorse (1929)

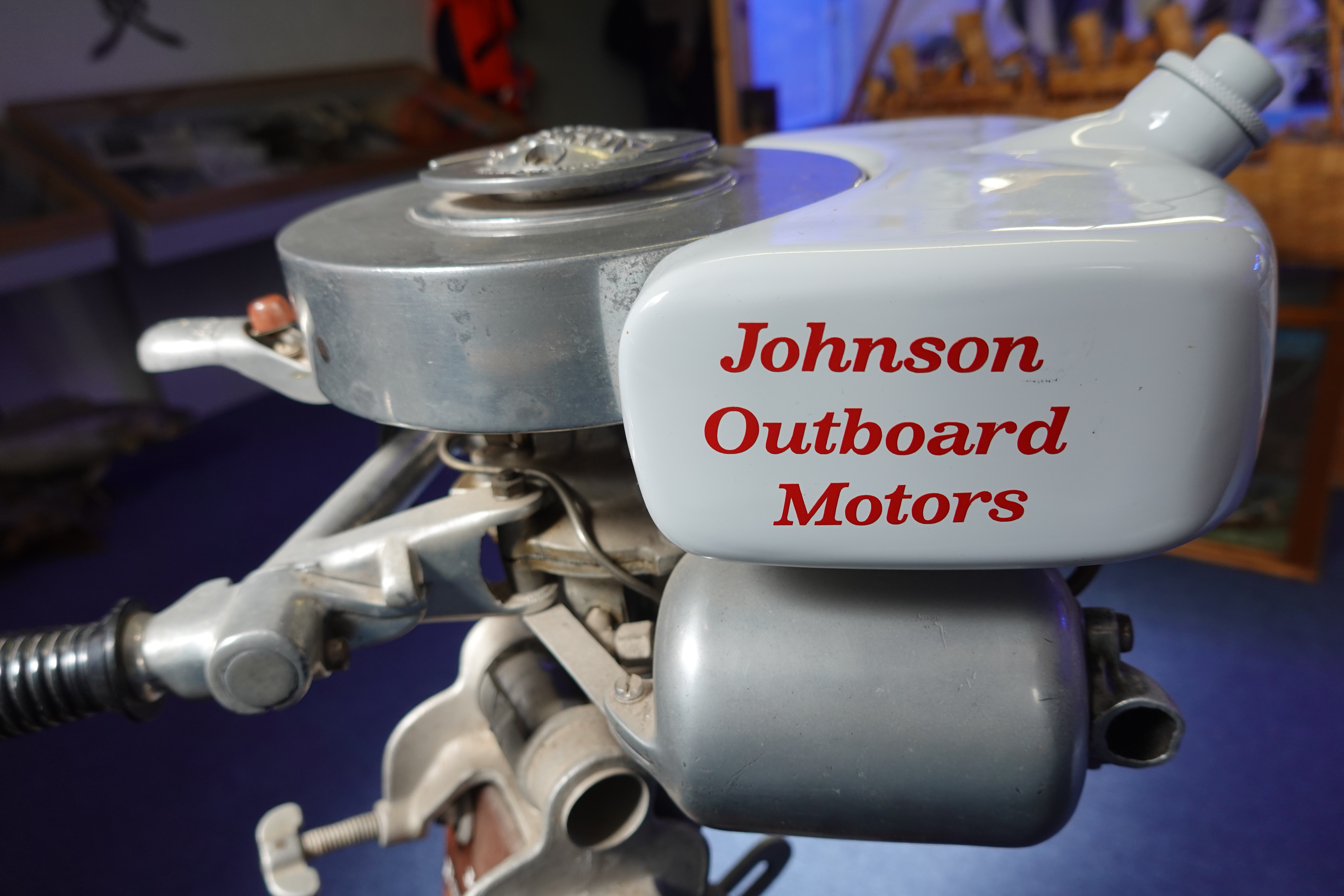
Johnson Seahorse (1929)

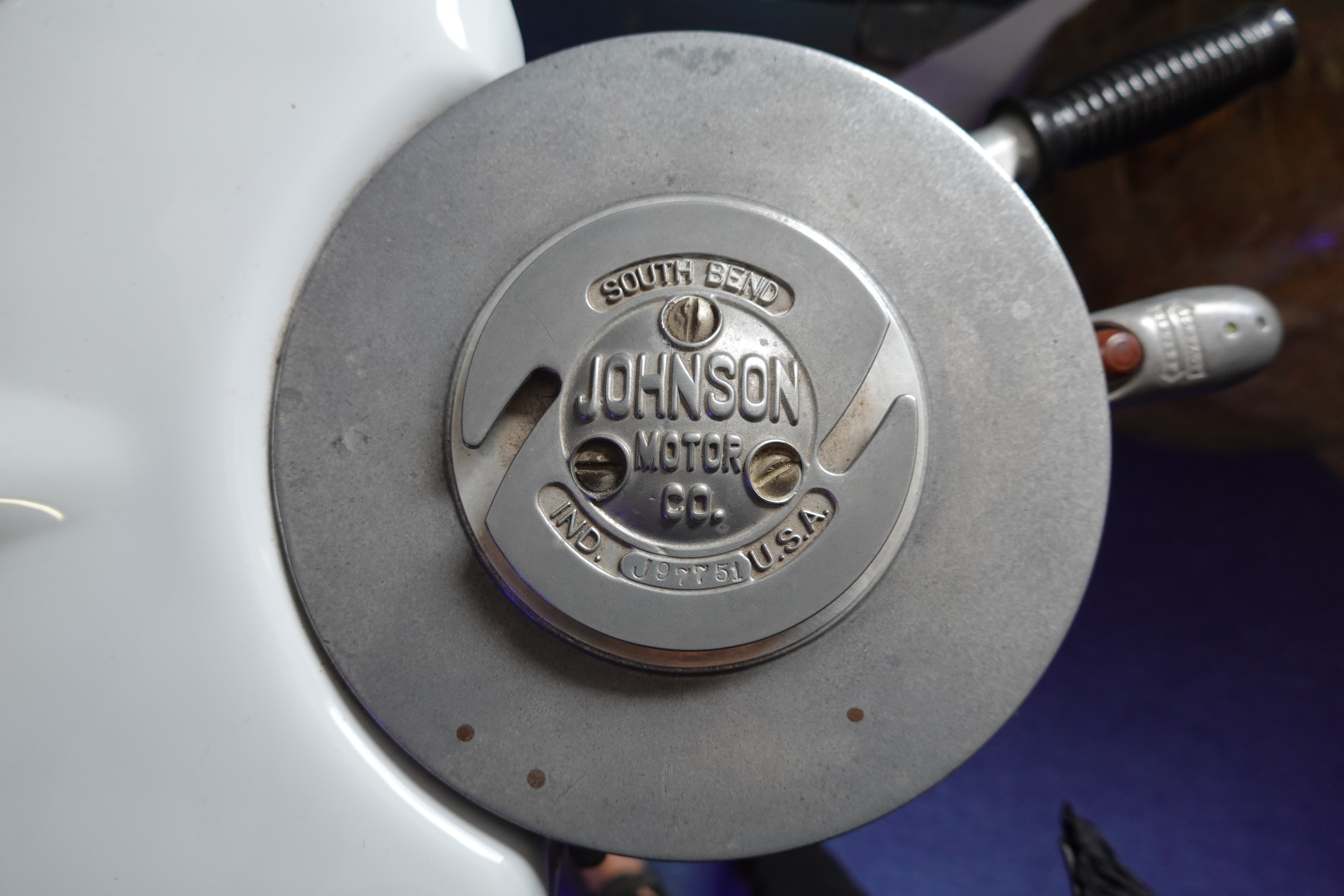
Johnson Seahorse (1929)

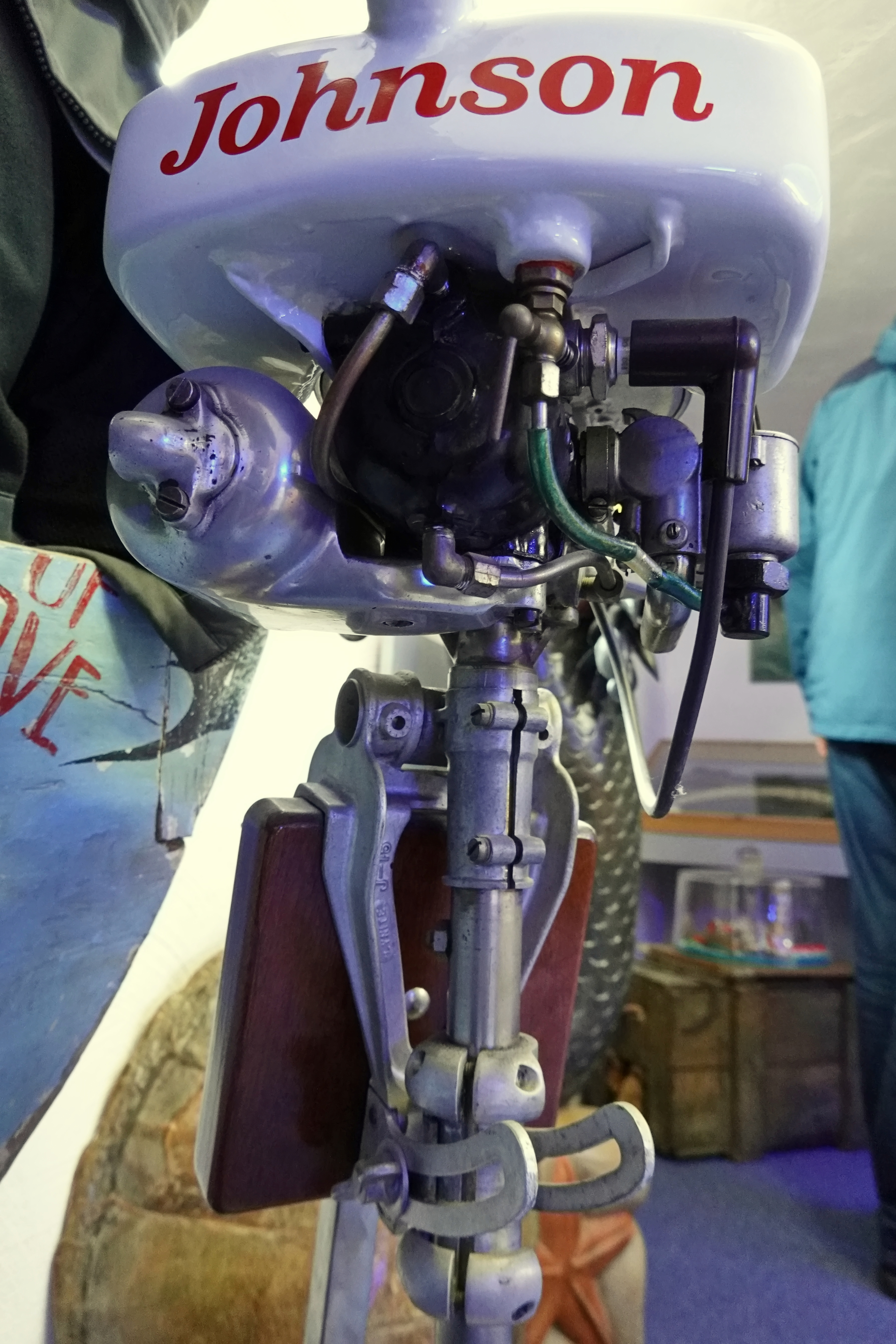
Johnson Seahorse (1929)

The Johnson brothers held over two hundred patents, and revolutionized the American outboard motor.

In 1931 an over-ambitious marketing programme failed to return on investment and the American company went bankrupt.

The company was first acquired by Outboard Marine Corporation (OMC) in 1935. In 1936, a fire destroyed part of the Peterborough plant.

OMC filed for bankruptcy on 22 December 2000. It has been owned since 2001 by the Canadian firm Bombardier Recreational Products. Bombardier stopped selling outboards under the Johnson brand after 2007, and moved all sales entirely to Evinrude Outboard Motors until they were discontinued in June 2020. Bombardier supports existing Johnson outboard motors through servicing and parts. Evinrude also provides information about the year of manufacture for vintage Johnson motors, if the model number and serial number can be provided.

== See also ==
- Evinrude Outboard Motors
- Outboard Marine Corporation
