= Outboard Marine Corporation =

Former American boat manufacturer

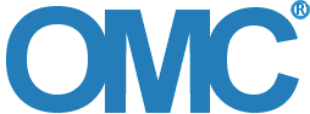
- Industry: Marine Outboard Motors and Boats
- Founded: 1907; 119 years ago in Milwaukee, Wisconsin, United States
- Defunct: December 22, 2000; 25 years ago
- Fate: Defunct
- Headquarters: Waukegan, Illinois, United States

Outboard Marine Corporation (OMC) was a maker of Evinrude, Johnson and Gale Outboard Motors, and many different brands of boats. It was a multibillion-dollar Fortune 500 corporation. Evinrude began in Milwaukee, Wisconsin in 1907. OMC was based in Waukegan, Illinois. They also owned several lines of boats such as Chris Craft, Lowe Boats, Princecraft, Four Winns, SeaSwirl, Stratos, and Javelin. OMC was also a parent company to Lawn-Boy and Ryan, which made lawn mowers, and Pioneer, a chainsaw company.

OMC sold 100,000 motors in 2000 and had one third of the outboard market. OMC filed for bankruptcy 22 December 2000 and laid off 7,000 employees.

The Johnson and Evinrude brands were won by bid in February 2001 by Bombardier Recreational Products and the boat division by Genmar Holdings of Minnesota. The former OMC plant #2 in Waukegan, Illinois is now a Superfund cleanup site.

== History ==
Outboard Marine Corporation sometimes referred to as Outboard Motor Company was formed in 1929 when ELTO was merged with Lockwood-Ash Motor Company. They began using the name OMC in 1956. Outboard Marine Corporation was the world's largest manufacturer and supplier of outboard motors and second largest producer of powerboats. Based in Waukegan, Illinois the company had become famous for its brand-name Johnson and Evinrude outboard motors, as well as its Chris-Craft and Grumman powerboats. Other products under the brand names of Four Winns, Seaswirl, Trade Winds, Sunbird, Stratos, and Hydra-Sports include fiberglass runabouts, cruisers, performance boats, and craft for offshore fishing. Outboard Marine also marketed clothing for boating, and resort wear. Unfortunately, during the late 1980s and early 1990s, Outboard Marine had a difficult time keeping up with the competition, notably archrival Brunswick Corporation, currently the world's largest manufacturer of powerboats.

=== Early years ===
Motorized transport was just becoming an everyday part of life in 1907, when Ole Evinrude first mass-produced a practical outboard engine for boats. Evinrude placed an advertisement in a motor magazine to introduce his motor, drawing so many inquiries from U.S. and overseas readers that he decided to try large-scale production. Needing financial help with this undertaking, he found a backer and established the Evinrude Motor Company in 1910.

The business was an instant success—its market included not only recreational boaters but also the Scandinavian fishing fleets operating in the North Sea. Friction between the partners forced Evinrude to sell his share to his backer in 1914 and depart, after signing a guarantee restricting him from the outboard motor industry for five years. The company continued without him, becoming a subsidiary of the gasoline-engine manufacturer Briggs & Stratton Corporation in 1926.

By 1921, Evinrude was back in business, in a venture he called the ELTO Outboard Motor Company. His new offering was the Evinrude Light Twin Outboard, a motor partly made of aluminum, reducing its weight by a third. Popular with the fishing fleets, this engine outstripped sales of Evinrude's original outboard motor within three years. It also attracted the attention of a competitor, Johnson Motor Company, which brought out its rival lightweight engine in 1922. Johnson gained market share, snatching the lead four years later with an updated model weighing 100 pounds, costing $190, and able to drive a boat at 16 miles per hour. Neither the Evinrude Company nor ELTO could match this. Now far ahead, Johnson produced a net profit of $433,000 in 1927, far outpacing Evinrude's $25,000 and ELTO's $30,000.

A new engine in 1928 restored the ELTO Company, whose annual net profit rose to $300,000. Ole Evinrude merged ELTO with Stephen Briggs the following year when he and Harold Stratton disagreed over diversifying Briggs & Stratton into the outboard engine market. Mr. Briggs became chairman of the brand-new Outboard Motors Corporation with Mr. Evinrude as the president.

=== The Great Depression and World War II ===
Outboard scarcely had time to find its feet before the stock market crash of 1929 tested its staying power. Already responsible for $500,000 in bank loans as a result of the merger, the company had to increase its debt to $600,000 between 1930 and 1932, when operating deficits totaled $550,000. To keep the business afloat, the entire inventory was sold at bargain prices, and Evinrude sacrificed his salary until his death in 1934.

Johnson's fate was worse. A too-costly advertising campaign, as well as an ill-timed offering of matched motors and hulls, drained all cash reserves by 1930, when control of the company passed to its bankers. Next came an attempt to lessen its reliance on seasonal sales by entry into the refrigerator-compressor market. This last-ditch effort did not revive the business, and shortly thereafter Johnson was for sale.

In 1935, the Outboard Motors Corporation bought the Johnson Motor Company. Its $800,000 price tag brought Outboard a line of outboards and plant and equipment worth $1.5 million. It also brought Outboard established overseas markets in China, Burma, Iran, and Albania, to broaden Evinrude's array of dealers in Europe, Australia, and New Zealand. Another plus was Johnson's niche in the refrigeration market; Outboard established the Gale Products Division at Galesburg, Illinois, to manufacture this new line.

Expansion brought changes. No longer devoted to purely marine interests, the company changed its name in 1936, to the Outboard Marine & Manufacturing Company. Stephen F. Briggs resigned his Outboard chairmanship temporarily—he had held this position since 1929 to take the Johnson helm. He instituted a rigorous cost-cutting regime, and by 1937 the Johnson division's gross sales were $4.3 million, as compared with Evinrude-ELTO's $2.5 million.

By now, Outboard Motors accounted for about 60 percent of U.S. outboard motor production. There were three engine lines, suiting most needs: the ELTO line for the buyer seeking thrift; Evinrude, the prestige line; and Johnson, offering special features. Though there was cooperation, operations were largely independent. This left each division to award contracts to outside bidders as well as those sharing a place under the Outboard umbrella. Even export sales operations were handled differently; although they were all routed through the Waukegan headquarters, Johnson tended to sell directly to its dealers, while most Evinrude sales were passed through distributors and then to the dealers.

In addition to the engines, selling mostly in seasonal markets, there were other items broadening the product lines. The Lawn-Boy lawnmower had been an Evinrude staple since 1932, along with pumps for drainage, firefighting, and lawn spraying. Offerings from Johnson included small generators, a gasoline engine for washing machines, and refrigerators. In combination with the motors, all these produced net sales of $6.8 million by 1937, generating profits of $945,000.

In the early 1940s, Outboard's facilities were all converted to the production of war materials. Bomb fuses, aircraft engines, and firefighting apparatus flowed from the Outboard factories, along with landing-boat motors for the Navy. Evinrude four-cylinder engines carried troops across the Rhine. Net sales for 1945 reached $1.8 million, topping $2.5 million the following year.

The personnel who steered the company through the hectic war years were Outboard oldtimers. In addition to Briggs, there was Joseph G. Rayniak, director of manufacturing research, whose career dated back to the Johnson brothers' 2 horsepower Light Twin, unveiled in 1922. There was Finn T. Irgens, holder of 92 patents, who had risen to be director of engineering from a start with Ole Evinrude, in 1929. There was Ralph Evinrude, who had succeeded to the company presidency after his father's death in 1934.

=== Expansion and growth in the postwar years ===
These longtime staff members were all on hand with the return of peacetime, when the company converted its facilities back to the production of Johnson and Evinrude outboard motors. Spending $8 million on plant expansion and improvement by 1952, Outboard then offered models ranging from one-cylinder, 3 horsepower engines to two-cylinder, 25 horsepower models.

Several acquisitions broadened the Outboard product line during the 1950s. The first, in 1952, was RPM Manufacturing Company of Missouri, whose specialty was a rotary power mower that Outboard planned to sell under its Lawn-Boy tradename. Featuring a detachable engine useful as an outboard, the mower was already a best-selling unbranded item in both the Sears and the Spiegel catalogs. Outboard coped with the huge volume of existing orders by completing entire units in one factory, rather than using the more time-consuming method of piecemeal assembly in several locations.

In 1956, the company changed its name to Outboard Marine Corporation (OMC). The same year, OMC purchased Industrial Engineering, Canada's largest chain-saw manufacturer, for C$2.55 million plus 40,000 shares. OMC moved this new subsidiary to Peterborough, Ontario, and changed the name Industrial Engineering to Pioneer Saws Ltd.

Cushman (company) of Nebraska joined the company subsidiary list in 1957. Well known in the utility vehicle field, Cushman had manufactured the Airborne, a motor scooter dropped by parachute for ground transport of paratroopers. Later the company's lightweight vehicles became popular for agricultural, industrial, and recreational use. Costing 114,000 shares at 30¢ par, the new acquisition added three-wheel mail carriers, golf carts, and motor scooters to the OMC product line. Besides the Johnson and Evinrude motors then being sold by about 7,000 retail dealers, the swelling list of OMC offerings included Gale Buccaneer motors sold through hardware jobbers, as well as a number of unbranded models sold for retailers.

The company's most innovative engine appeared in 1958. The first mass-produced die-cast aluminum engine, it was a four-cylinder, 50 horsepower outboard, completely manufactured by OMC, its V-blocks came from Johnson, its steel parts from Evinrude, while the Gale division contributed its carburetors and ignition systems.

Export sales of all items surged ahead during the 1950s. Seeing a 215 percent gain in exports between 1949 and 1956, OMC expanded its export department in 1956, gaining a new subsidiary called Outboard Marine International S.A. By 1960, taking the next logical step of overseas production, the company was manufacturing and assembling motors in Brugge, Belgium. All these developments showed in the annual net sales, which soared from $27 million in 1950 to $171.5 million by 1959.

During the 1950s, OMC's main objective had been acquisitions to broaden basic product lines. In the 1960s, the company's aim was to improve all these products and find growing markets for them. Ensuring its industry leadership by constant innovation and improvement to existing products, OMC allocated more than $7 million annually to research and development.

As the 1960s began, the United States was in the trough of a recession. First-time buyers as well as those seeking bigger and better leisure-time equipment put their purchases on hold. Because its principal markets were tied to leisure-time activities mostly practiced on a seasonal basis, OMC sales sank to a 1961 low of $132.3 million.

The economic turndown did not, however, prevent the company from starting a five-year philanthropic program in 1961. In response to a request to benefit the United Nations Food and Agriculture Organization's freedom-from-hunger campaign, OMC contributed several hundred outboard engines each year to be used in fishing, part of a program to increase food production in underdeveloped countries. Also in 1961, the company established the OMC Boats Division to produce and market 16- to 19-foot boats featuring both outboard and the newer stern-drive engines. Production began the following year, helping to raise sales to $151.9 million by 1962.

The stern-drive, or inboard-outboard motors, were available both as separate units for boat-builders, or as components of boats produced by OMC. Built to give the fuel economy and dependability of inboard engines, they were nevertheless as versatile as outboards. By 1965 the company was selling only about 20,000 stern drives a year, however, and sales of the outboards were still outpacing them tenfold. The problem stemmed from the engine's state-of-the-art technology; many dealers did not know how to repair these motors, and owners were often ignorant of maintenance needs. OMC met this challenge by developing computerized week-long repair and maintenance classes for dealer training. Four schools, two permanently stationed in San Francisco, California, and Waukegan, Illinois, and two mobile units familiarized customers with the new engines.

During the 1960s, public interest in novel sports offered new market potential. OMC entered the snowmobile industry, introducing the Evinrude Skeeter and the Johnson Skee-Horse in 1964, each capable of speeds exceeding 30 miles per hour. Another innovation was the Evinrude Aquanaut for skin diving, also sold under the Johnson tradename Air-Buoy. Consisting of a floating gasoline-powered compressor, the unit supplied air to two masked divers at the same time. Another breakthrough was the loop-charged outboard, devised after the company went back to powerboat racing for the first time since World War II.

By October 1967, OMC's fiscal year-end sales had reached $233.4 million. Of this amount, 10 percent came from power mowers, with golf carts and utility vehicles sharing second place at 7 percent, and with snowmobiles, the fastest-growing segment of the business, also at 7 percent. Chain saw sales accounted for 4 percent of the final figure, while a full 70 percent came from marine products. The only failure of the decade was the boat-building enterprise; initially small operating losses grew each year, until the line was sold to Chris-Craft in 1970. Otherwise, the 1960s had been lucrative, as the 1969 net sales figure of $327.1 million showed.

=== Retrenchment and reorganization in the 1970s ===
The 1970s began with a dip to $304.5 million in net sales. This was partly due to the unprofitable boat line, and partly to a line of tent campers that had never fulfilled expectations after the 1967 acquisition of their manufacturer, Trade Winds Campers. The company discontinued the line in 1971, and immediately saw the improvement in their net sales figures, which soared to $394 million by 1972.

There were other disappointments. Golf cart sales sank to 2 percent of overall revenue by 1974, and were discontinued in 1975. Chain saw sales totaled $19.1 million in 1976, resulting in losses for the company and reflecting a flattening of future market potential. OMC discontinued them the following year. Snowmobiles, constituting about 4 percent of sales volume in 1972, were offered in 1973 with an optional Wankel engine costing about $235 more than the conventional motor. Though this was the United States's first introduction to the revolutionary rotary engine, OMC's hopes of success were dashed by heavy competition from other snowmobile brands, as well as by two winters of sparse snow. Snowmobile production came to an end in 1976, after a fiscal 1974 operating loss of $13.9 million.

Fuel shortages were another downside. Coming to an OPEC-inspired zenith in 1973, they brought fears of a buying slowdown in the peak spring quarter. An OMC environmental executive warned of possible gasoline rationing by the petroleum industry, and outlined steps for fuel conservation among boaters.

In the same year, OMC purchased a five-acre site in Hong Kong. Intended as a first step towards larger outboard motor markets in Asia, the move was also encouraged by a Hong Kong government program designed to attract specific, technologically advanced industries. Assembly operations began in the plant in 1975, with the manufacture of electronic outboard motor components following two years later.

In 1974, Charles D. Strang succeeded W. C. Scott as president. Strang's interest in powerboats, beginning in boyhood, had lasted through college and a post as a research associate at Massachusetts Institute of Technology. During a later period of employment with the makers of Mercury outboard motors, interest had deepened into vocation. In 1966 his experience in the powerboat industry had brought him to OMC. Eight years later he rose to the presidency.

An environmental question was one of his first challenges. It began in 1976, when OMC was cited by both the U.S. and Illinois environmental protection agencies for polluting a drainage ditch and Waukegan harbor with polychlorinated biphenyls (PCBs). The company filed suit against both agencies after lengthy negotiations, charging that the federal government had dragged its feet in spending funds authorized for pollution-control use. Company attorneys also stated that the PCB-contaminated pipes had been replaced in 1976, but the agencies likewise filed suit, asking that the company be ordered to remove the contaminants from the harbor, and to pay a maximum penalty of about $20 million, reflecting a $10,000 fine for each day the PCB sources had been in place. This suit was to dog OMC's footsteps throughout the 1980s.

Reorganizing his domestic operations was another Strang priority, with bringing together the Evinrude and Johnson divisions at the top of the list. Complete separation of the two since the company's beginnings had fostered an intense rivalry between them, along with disregard for competition by manufacturers outside the company. To unite the company against outside competitors, in 1978 Strang centralized all domestic manufacturing operations at the corporate headquarters in Waukegan, Illinois, charging vice president James C. Chapman with responsibility for their coordination, as well as for manufacturing policy.

Next came long-range plans for dealing with the competitors themselves. Chief among these were the Japanese firm Yamaha, eating into OMC's European market, and Brunswick Corporation, makers of premium-priced Mercury outboards. A joint venture between Yamaha and Brunswick had produced a low-cost engine called Mariner; thus Brunswick then had an engine at both high and low ends of the market, leaving OMC sandwiched in the middle. With his newly united company behind him, Strang cleared this hurdle by slashing prices by 25 percent and also by making sure that all products offered by competitors were available in the OMC lineup. In another move, he bought out independent distributors overseas, thus gaining greater control over foreign marketing operations.

Threatening OMC's competitiveness was a 1980 Department of Energy proposal that boating be banned on weekends. As a result of this suggestion, public concern about gasoline shortages caused OMC's net sales to plummet to $687.4 million in 1980, from $741.2 million just one year earlier. It was not easy to maintain the company's competitive edge against the Japanese at this time, but Strang slashed budgets, reducing his work force by one-third, to save an annual pretax amount of $47 million. The reward for this effort showed at the end of fiscal 1982, when net sales reached $778 million.

=== Transition in the 1980s and 1990s ===
OMC was now in a position to spend $100 million on the construction and tooling of nine new plants. Contrary to previous practice, each plant was designed to specialize in one manufacturing function. In addition, overseas plants were refined to reduce operations costs and provide more efficient handling and storage. Streamlining made product innovation easier. Power steering, variable-ratio oiling—delivering exact mixtures of gasoline and oil to the engine—and saltwater protection were new features appreciated by powerboat buyers. Starting in 1983, OMC began to prepare the way for a new stern-drive engine, to supersede previous models. After reviewing the stern-drive market, the company sent interviewers to dealers and service department personnel, gathering information for the ideal stern-drive engine. The result was the OMC Cobra, introduced in 1985. Designed for both boat builders and consumers, its 7.5 liter engine delivered 340 horsepower.

In 1984, James Chapman stepped into the presidency of the company, succeeding Robert F. Wallace, whose short tenure had lasted from January 1982. Like his predecessors, Chapman grappled with the Waukegan Harbor question. This issue was finally laid to rest in April 1989, when the U.S. Department of Justice ordered OMC to fund a trust to remove the pollutants from Lake Michigan.

This was just the beginning of OMC's problems, however. In 1988, the boat market peaked and then went into a tailspin. Although Chapman decided to purchase 15 boatmakers to assure OMC of captive customers for their outboard engines, the company did not develop a comprehensive or well-designed strategy to manage its growing operations efficiently. In the middle of the worst downturn in the industry's history, Chapman reduced staff, closed factories, and eliminated whole product lines, such as Chris-Craft engines and boat models—all to no avail. Between 1990 and 1993, OMC suffered losses totaling $440 million.

In 1989, OMC purchased some of the holdings of Murray Industries, Inc., makers of Chris-Craft boats. That same year, OMC sold off Lawn-Boy, a popular lawn mower company, and Cushman to The Toro Company and Ransomes respectively. The sales netted a much needed $248 million in cash for OMC. One portion of the money was used for capital improvements for its boatbuilding facilities while another portion was invested in building a new Suncruiser aluminum pontoon boat. Despite the large expenditures, OMC's decision to focus on boatbuilding proved to be a good one. OMC was able to pair boats with appropriately powered outboards and sales of boat packages doubled within a one-year timeframe.

Smaller and quieter V-6s were introduced in 1991 in the form of the Evinrude Spitfire and the Johnson Silver-Star series. These outboards featured a new flushing device that could be used to flush the engine with fresh water while it was running. The Spitfire and Silver-Star models also used an infra-red sensor system called Optical Ignition System (OIS 2000). This system automatically advanced the engine timing to eliminate unwanted timing changes. Other advancements in 1991 included smaller, more fuel efficient diesel stern drive models. The OMC Cobra Diesel was a 970-pound, 3.2 liter, six-cylinder monoblock inline powerhouse that produced 205-hp at 4300 rpm.

Electronic Fuel Injection (EFI) was introduced on some OMC drive systems in 1993, representing the first time that EFI was available to recreational stern drive customers. With the previous carbureted systems, boaters had to endure a nine-step starting sequence. With the EFI, boaters had only to turn the key and shift into gear.

By 1993, OMC had more than 20 brands in the marketplace, ranging from canoes to cruisers. Operations were divided into three groups – the Fishing Boat Group, the Recreational Boat Group, and the Aluminum Boat Group. Each group was responsible for all manufacturing and marketing efforts associated with its line of products. The Fishing Boat Group included Stratos, Hydra-Sports, Javelin and Quest by Four Winns. The Recreational Boat Group produced 80 models under the brand names Chris-Craft, Donzi, Four Winns, Seaswirl and Sunbird. The Aluminum Boat Group included Duranautic, Princecraft/Springbok, Suncruiser, Lowe, Sea Nymph, Grumman, and Roughneck. Many of these same brands are still in production today.

=== End of an era ===
As OMC continued to lose money, Harry Bowman, the former CEO of Whirlpool Corporation, was hired to replace Chapman. When the boat industry finally rebounded from its economic downturn in 1994, OMC did not have enough of the right kind of product for its customers since much of it had been sold by Chapman. Bowman immediately formed a joint venture with Volvo to consolidate two engines into one brand name, finalized a contract with a German firm to bring in new technology for high-pressure fuel injectors so that OMC engines could be more fuel-efficient, initiated a thoroughgoing advertising campaign to strengthen its brand name Evinrude and Johnson outboard engines, and began to develop a new generation of outboard motors that were environmentally acceptable, fuel-efficient, and easily repaired. Bowman's strategy worked. By the middle of 1995, OMC's revenues were $1.1 billion.

The company faced net revenue losses of $7.3 million in the 2nd quarter of 1997 ending March 31 and would have been worse if $2 million in dividends were not suspended. The previous quarter loss was $14.3 million even after selling assets such as the corporate jet. In April 1997, OMC hired Salomon Brothers to explore future option such as a buyout or merger. In 1997, Detroit Diesel made a $16 a share bid for OMC. They were outbid at $18 a share by Alfred Kingsley who previously owned 2 million shares purchased at $17 a share and had no experience in the outboard industry. The deal was backed by George Soros. Carl Icahn, a corporate raider who bought TWA in 1988, is said to blame Kingsley his lieutenant during the 1980s for the ensuing TWA bankruptcy a few years later. David Jones, former Mercury Marine Division president until August 1997, was hired by Kingsley in September 1997 to become the president and CEO of OMC, but resigned in August 2000 due to financial turmoil at OMC. In March 1998, OMC laid off 200 employees after earlier laying off 348. In September 1998, OMC announced the closure of their Milwaukee, Wisconsin and Waukegan, Illinois plants over the next two years.

OMC released the 1997 FICHT fuel injected motor in 1996 to meet stiffer EPA guidelines. This motor used gasoline direct injection developed by Ficht GmbH Germany. This motor had problems due to the transition phase of operation being exactly at the same trolling speed of many fishermen and had problems early on, and the smoking and knocking of these engines, along with many pistons and rods exploding out the sides of the engine block, created an aura of doom to potential new customers. Some outboard motor industry insiders have speculated the rush to meet EPA standards helped with the undoing of OMC.

OMC sold 100,000 motors in 2000 and had one third of the outboard market. OMC filed for bankruptcy 22 December 2000 and laid off 7,000 employees. Private investment company Oak Point Partners acquired the remnant assets, consisting of any known and unknown assets that weren't previously administered, from the Outboard Marine Corporation, et al., Substantively Consolidated Bankruptcy Estate on January 16, 2020. The Johnson and Evinrude brands were won by bid in February 2001 by Bombardier Recreational Products and the boat division by Genmar Holdings of Minnesota. The former OMC plant #2 in Waukegan, Illinois is now a Superfund cleanup site.

== North American factories ==
- Waukegan, Illinois - Corporate Headquarters, outboard engine component manufacturing, research & development
- Galesburg, Illinois Gale Outboard Motors- Department store labeled motors, parts manufacturer for Johnson, Evinrude. Lawn-Boy lawnmower engines and Equipment. Shutdown 1984.
- Calhoun, Georgia (Marine Power Products Group) - Johnson & Evinrude outboards, manufacturing and complete assembly
- Spruce Pine, North Carolina - Power Head (engine block) lost foam casting, Johnson & Evinrude outboard engines
- Andrews, North Carolina - Gear Case casting, machining and subassembly, Johnson & Evinrude outboards
- Burnsville, North Carolina - Lower Unit casting, machining and subassembly, Johnson & Evinrude outboards
- Sturtevant, Wisconsin - Division Headquarters, marine propulsion manufacturing, research & development
- Milwaukee, Wisconsin - Crankshafts, drive shafts, propellers, miscellaneous steel products, fuel system components, Johnson & Evinrude outboards
- Delavan, Wisconsin - Fuel system components, Johnson & Evinrude outboards
- Murfreesboro, Tennessee - Stratos & Javelin fishing Boats, manufacturing and complete assembly
- Peterborough, Ontario - Johnson/Evinrude Outboards (Closed in 1990)
- Lexington, TN - Cobra Outdrives

== Principal subsidiaries ==
- Hong Kong, Outboard Marine Asia, Ltd.
- Belgium, OMC Europe
- Australia, Outboard Marine Australia Pty. Ltd.
- Canada, Outboard Marine Corporation of Canada, Ltd.
- Mexico, Outboard Marine de Mexico, S.A. de C.V.
- Sweden, Ryds Båtindustri AB

== See also ==
- Johnson Outboards
- Evinrude Outboard Motors
