= Arthur William Wall =

British engineer (1874 - unknown)

- Born: Mook, Netherlands
- Occupation: Engineer
- Era: Victorian Era
- Notable work: Self Powered Wheel

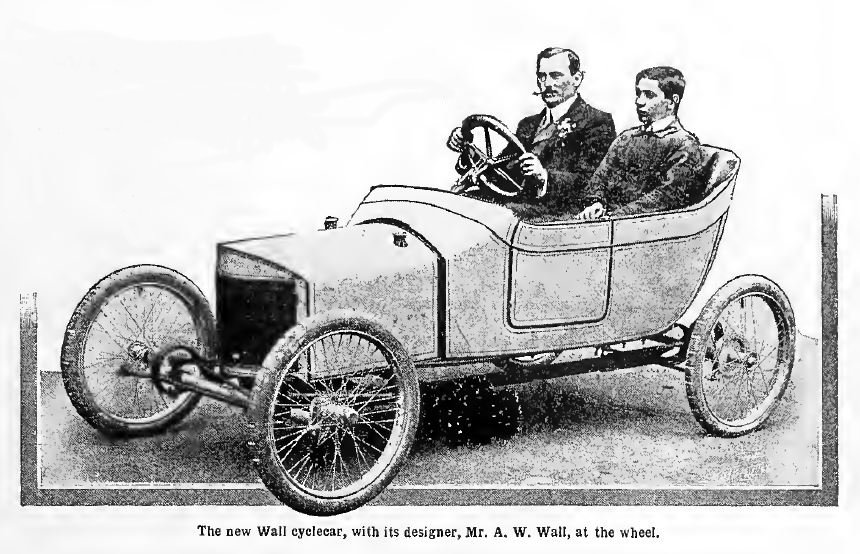

Arthur William Wall (born 21 October 1874) was an engineer in the field of motorised transport and inventor of the self-powered wheel in England in the early 20th century. He is best known for his creation of the self-powered wheel, the Wall Autowheel, which could be used to power a bicycle, but he was also the man behind Roc motorcycles and a tricar and four-wheel cyclecar. His main company was A. W. Wall Ltd, but he created several other companies (or subsidiaries) to compartmentalise his different activities, such as the Roc Gear Co, who supplied epicyclic gears to a significant number of manufacturers before WW1.

== ROC Motorcycles ==
By the early 1900s, Wall noticed the rise in bicycles in the United Kingdom which was a market he wanted to tap into. One of the earliest products of A. W. Wall Ltd launched at the Stanley Show in 1903, this unusually long and low motorcycle with a 3 hp engine had initially been used a Kelecom engine, but also was used to promote the ROC epicyclic hub gearboxes and clutches produced by ROC Gear Co. (another A. W. Wall firm). Kelecom merged with Ormonde in 1904, but the combined company failed later that year and the remaining assets was taken over by Taylor Gue, so the engine supplier must have changed. Most likely candidates were J.A.P. and F. E. Baker Ltd (maker of "Precision" engines), and the latter had certainly been adopted by 1913 and were used exclusively in the motor tricycle.

The ROC Motorcycle had a celebrity backer in Sir Arthur Conan Doyle, and in 1905 it was announced he had entered a motorcycle in the International Cup race and would nominate a rider to ride it for him.

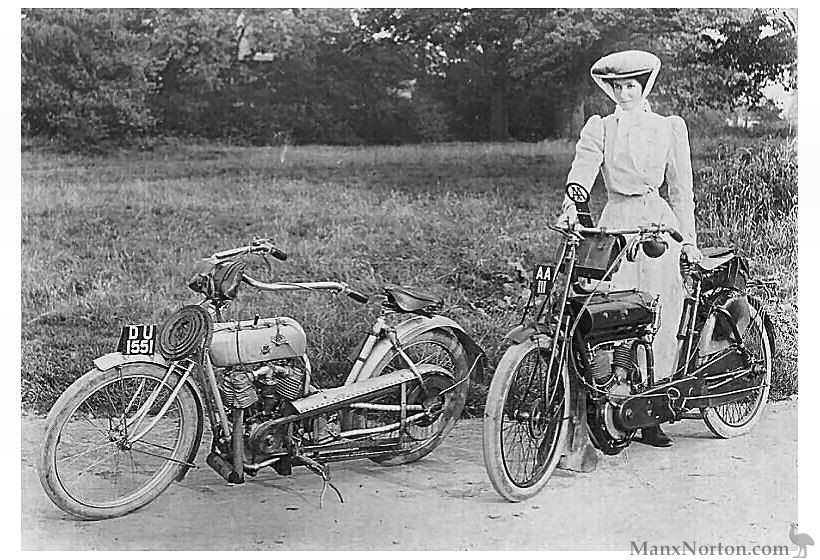
Roc at Right (and Rex on the left) with Muriel Hind in about 1907

In mid-1907 A.W.Wall Ltd revealed details of the patent Roc free engine clutch and hub gear, an epicyclic gear constantly in-mesh. Later that year, at the 1907 Crystal Palace show, Roc exhibited two models, a 4 hp single and a 5 hp twin, both fitted with Roc patent clutch. There was also a military version of the ROC motorcycle mentioned in 1907 and available as a 4HP single or a 5-6HP twin in 1909. This had the characteristic long low frame, with large ROC hub gear, and also the new ROC patent duplex sprung front forks. In 1907, he created a V-twin engined machine for Muriel Hind, to her specifications of a dropped (lady's) frame.

At the 1908 Stanley show two motorcycles were shown, the 4 hp single (83mm bore by 90mm stroke) and a new 5-6HP V-twin (75mm bore, 80mm stroke), both of these models now had mechanically operated inlet valves. Also shown as available for 1909 was the Roc 2-speed hub gear conversion "to fit practically every motorcycle". At the 1909 show they continued with their single and twin, but added a 6HP four cylinder motorcycle with pressed steel frame, with prop shaft drive.

At the 1913 Olympia Show 3 models were shown, the 6HP twin with Precision engine, and 4.5HP single, and a lightweight 2.75HP with a lightweight ROC gearbox. The 4.5HP model had a new four-speed gear with internal expanding clutch.

Other motorcycles licensed Roc equipment, for example in 1911 the Humber 3.5-HP 2-speed motorcycle was listed as having "Roc Patents". The Rex and the A.C. Sociable tricar also used the Roc patent gear.

== Wall Autowheel ==
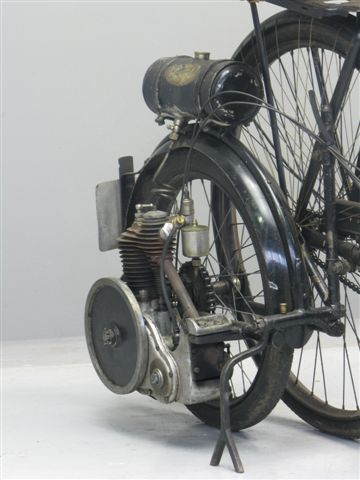
Wall Autowheel 118 cc 1914

Horris patented the autowheel concept in 1908 (GB190823080), and in November 1909 it was launched at the annual Stanley Show, and caused quite a sensation. Weighing 25 lbs the price was £15 5s. This first model was a 2-stroke of about 90cc. While it gathered a great deal of publicity, unfortunately it didn't appear on the market. In July 1910 it was explained that this was due to it not yet being perfected and that while many orders were received "deliveries were being kept back until the invention could be further experimented with" with the result that "very few have been put on the road".

By the time of the November Motor Cycle show in 1910 (this time held at Olympia) the design was said to have been perfected (with assistance from Messrs Humber Limited), and a show review reported that it is "now made by the Humber Company". However this too seemed to be premature, and it was still being perfected and improved in March 1912. The latest version was shown at the November 1912 show at Olympia, and by early 1913 it was in production under a new company, the International Auto-Wheel Company Ltd of Russell Road, London.

During the long stage of 'perfecting' the Auto-Wheel it had evolved into a four-stroke of 118cc (bore 2.125in, stroke 2.5in) with automatic inlet valve and in this form the Wall Autowheel was finally to become a success. In addition to home production (opinions vary as to whether all production was under licence by BSA), it was also licensed to other companies in France, Belgium and Holland and in the United States to A.O. Smith of Milwaukee, who even used it to power a buckboard known as the Smith Flyer, with the rights to this in turn passed to Briggs & Stratton, who made a buckboard known as the "Red Bug".

At the 1913 Olympia Show, it was announced that 1914 production was to be 5000 in house, and a further 5000 under licence to BSA. However, with the advent of WW1 production ceased, and while it remained advertised on sale by agents into 1915, it was likely these were items in stock.

After WW1 it appeared briefly as the power unit for the Silva Scooter.

== Wall Tricar ==
A. W. Wall Ltd introduced the ROC motor tricycle at the Olympia Show in 1910. It was described as having an "ornate coach-built body resembling a giant Easter Egg, which is set in an open pressed-steel frame". When it went into production in 1911 (in Tyseley, Birmingham) it had a sidecar type body, and has been described as more like an elaborate motorcycle and sidecar rather than a true cyclecar. The air-cooled engine drove a live rear axle through a clutch, gearbox and drive-shaft. Later models adopted a strong tubular frame, seating two side by side. It originally had tiller steering though this was replaced by wheel steering in 1914. Two models were built using F. E. Baker Ltd Precision air-cooled engines, one with a 6HP twin cylinder and the other with a 4.5HP single cylinder. At the 1913 Olympia Show it was said that the 4.5HP tricars were presented in several forms, mainly for goods carrying, but there was also a 2 seater with an 8HP air-cooled Precision engine.

Manufacture ceased in 1915.

== Wall Cyclecar ==
In 1912, Arthur Wall revealed his latest creation, a four-wheel cyclecar. Two models were to be built with the same combination of engines as used on the Tricar. Unlike many cyclecars, the transmission was via propshaft with universal joint to a live rear axle. The twin has a two-speed (and reverse) Roc epicyclic gearbox (Roc Gear Co of Hay Mills, Birmingham was also an A. W. Walls company). A new company, Wall Cars Ltd of Tyselely, Birmingham had been created to produce the cars.
