= Stephen Foster Briggs =

American engineer (1885–1976)

Stephen Foster Briggs (December 4, 1885 – October 16, 1976) was an American engineer, co-founder of the Briggs & Stratton manufacturing company, and founder of Outboard Marine Corporation.

== Early life and education ==
Stephen Foster Briggs was born in Watertown, South Dakota. Briggs then graduated from Watertown High School and from South Dakota State College in Brookings, South Dakota.

== Early career ==
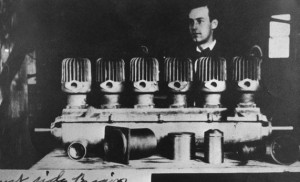
Briggs with his engine while at South Dakota State College in 1906.

Briggs' idea for his first product came from an upper-level engineering class project while at South Dakota State College. This first product was a six-cylinder, two-cycle engine, which Stephen Foster Briggs developed during his engineering courses at South Dakota State. After his graduation, he was eager to produce his engine and enter the rapidly expanding automobile industry. Bill Juneau, a coach at South Dakota State, knew of Briggs' ambition and the entrepreneurial interests of Harold M. Stratton, a successful grain merchant who had a farm next to Juneau's farm, so he introduced the two. In 1922, their fledgling company set a record in the automotive industry, selling the Briggs & Stratton Flyer (the "Red Bud") at record low prices of US$125-$150.

== Briggs & Stratton company ==
Launched in 1908 in Milwaukee, Wisconsin, and later based in Wauwatosa, Wisconsin.

The company began as an informal partnership between Briggs and Harold M. Stratton. Eventually Briggs and Stratton settled on manufacturing automotive components and small gasoline engines. Briggs purchased an engine patent from A.O. Smith Company and began powering early washing machines and reel mowers, as well as many other types of equipment. The company went public on the New York Stock Exchange in 1928.

During World War II, Briggs & Stratton produced generators for the war effort. Some pre-war engines were made with aluminum, which helped the company develop its expertise in using this material. This development, along with the post-war growth of 1950s suburbs (and lawns), helped secure Briggs & Stratton's successful growth throughout the 1950s and 1960s.

Stephen Briggs went on to purchase Evinrude and Johnson Outboards and start the Outboard Marine Corporation. Frederick P. Stratton, Sr. (the son of Harold Stratton) served as Chairman of Briggs & Stratton until his death in 1976. Frederick P. Stratton, Jr. served as Chairman until his retirement in 2001.
