= Harold Stratton =

Harold Stratton may refer to:

- Harold M. Stratton (1879–1962), American engineer and businessman
- Harold "Tuffy" Stratton (1920–1994), American college football coach
- Hal Stratton (born 1950), American attorney and former chairman of the U.S. Consumer Product Safety Commission
