= South Dakota State University =

Public university in Brookings, South Dakota, US

- Former names: Dakota Agriculture College (1881–1904); South Dakota State College of Agriculture and Mechanic Arts (1904–1964)
- Type: Public land-grant research university
- Established: February 21,1881; 145 years ago
- Parent institution: South Dakota Board of Regents
- Accreditation: HLC
- Academic affiliations: Space-grant; Sun-grant
- Endowment: $292.6 million (2025)
- President: Barry H. Dunn
- Provost: Dennis Hedge
- Faculty: 622.81 (2021-2022)
- Total staff: 2,034.41 (FTE)
- Students: 12,139 (Fall 2025)
- Undergraduates: 10,728
- Postgraduates: 1,337
- Other students: 342 (professional)
- Location: Brookings, South Dakota, United States; 44°19′05″N 96°47′00″W
- Campus: 400.69 acres (162.15 ha); Remote town
- Other campuses: Rapid City; Sioux Falls
- Newspaper: The Collegian
- Colors: Yellow and blue
- Nickname: Jackrabbits
- Sporting affiliations: NCAA Division I FCS - Summit League; MVFC; Big 12
- Mascot: Jack the Jackrabbit
- Website: sdstate.edu

South Dakota State University (SDSU or SD State) is a public land-grant research university in Brookings, South Dakota, United States. Founded in 1881, it is the state's largest university and is the second oldest continually operating university in the state. The university is governed by the South Dakota Board of Regents.

South Dakota State University is a land-grant university founded under the provisions of the 1862 Morrill Act. This land-grant heritage and mission has led the university to place a special focus on academic programs in agriculture, engineering, nursing, and pharmacy, as well as liberal arts. It is classified among "R2: Doctoral Universities – High research activity". The graduate program is classified as Doctoral, Science, Technology, Engineering, Math dominant.

== History ==
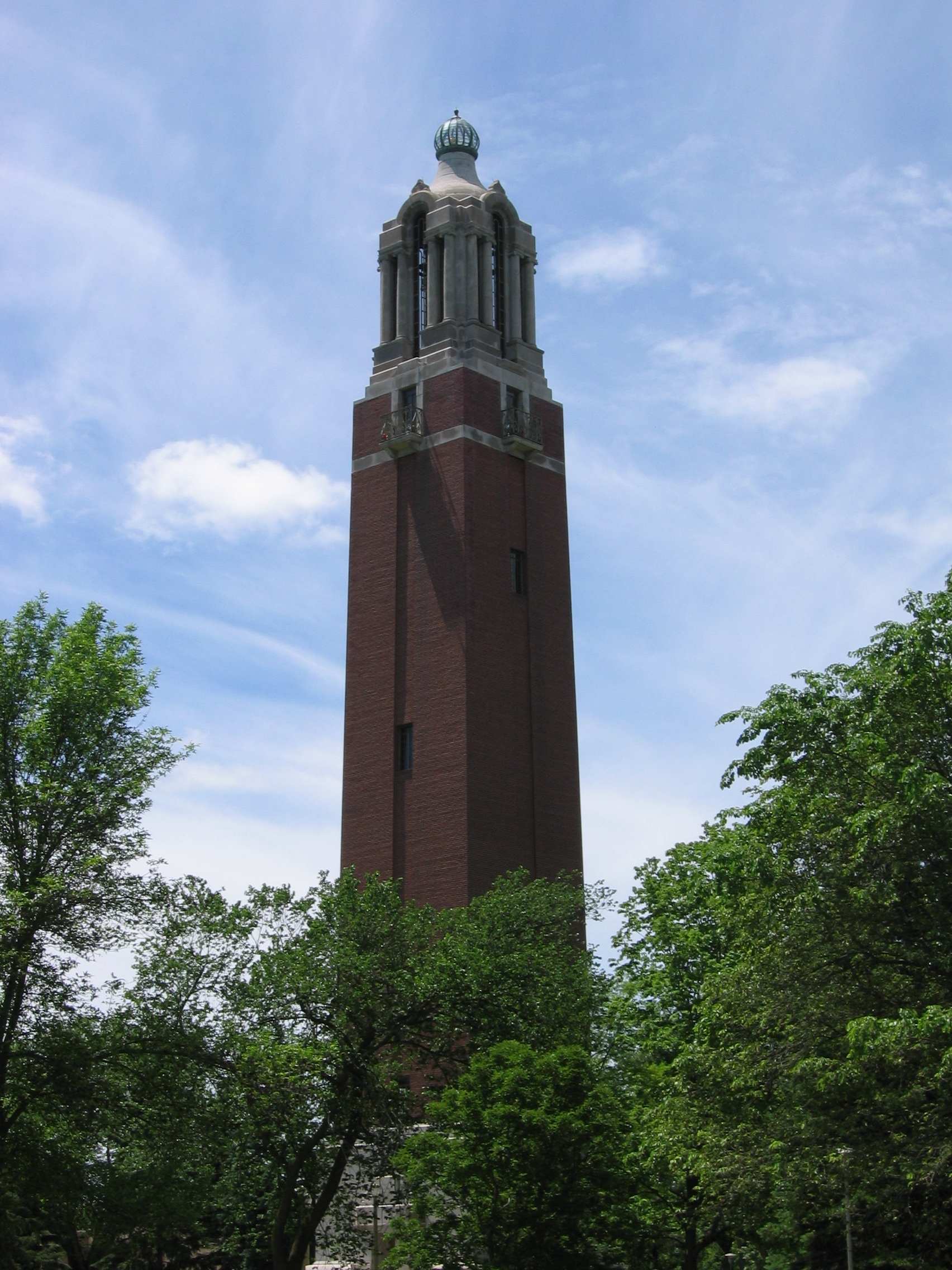
The Coughlin Campanile completed in 1929 on west campus. It was listed on the National Register of Historic Places in 1987.

South Dakota State University was founded in the Dakota Territory on February 21, 1881, as Dakota Agriculture College. The first building, with funding from the territorial legislature, was built in 1883, six years before the State of South Dakota was formed. Numerous expansions were funded in the late 19th century and early 20th century. The name was changed in 1904 to South Dakota State College of Agriculture and Mechanic Arts. In 1964, the name was changed to South Dakota State University. The name change was largely promoted by the alumni association. Initiated in 1962, this name change reflected the more comprehensive education offered at the university.

In 1923, SDSU's instructional program was organized under five divisions: Agriculture, Engineering, General Science, Home Economics, and Pharmacy. In 1956, a Nursing program was established, and in 1957 a formal graduate school was formed. When the university changed its name in 1964, the colleges were renamed Agriculture and Biological Sciences, Arts and Sciences, Engineering, Home Economics, Nursing, Pharmacy, and the Graduate School. In 1974, the College of General Registration (now the College of General Studies) was formed. In 1975, the Division of Education was created. An Honors College was formed in 1999. Two colleges and seven departments combined in 2009 to create the College of Education and Human Sciences.

In 2017, the colleges which make up the university were revised and in some cases renamed to the following: College of Agriculture, Food and Environmental Sciences; College of Arts, Humanities and Social Sciences; College of Education and Human Sciences; College of Natural Sciences; College of Nursing; College of Pharmacy & Allied Health Professions; Graduate School; Jerome J. Lohr College of Engineering; University College; and Van D. and Barbara B. Fishback Honors College.

On April 22, 2025, the United States Department of Government Efficiency (DOGE) announced it would be canceling over $86 million in research funding from the Department of Agriculture (USDA) that had been designated for South Dakota State University.

== Campus ==
=== Main campus ===
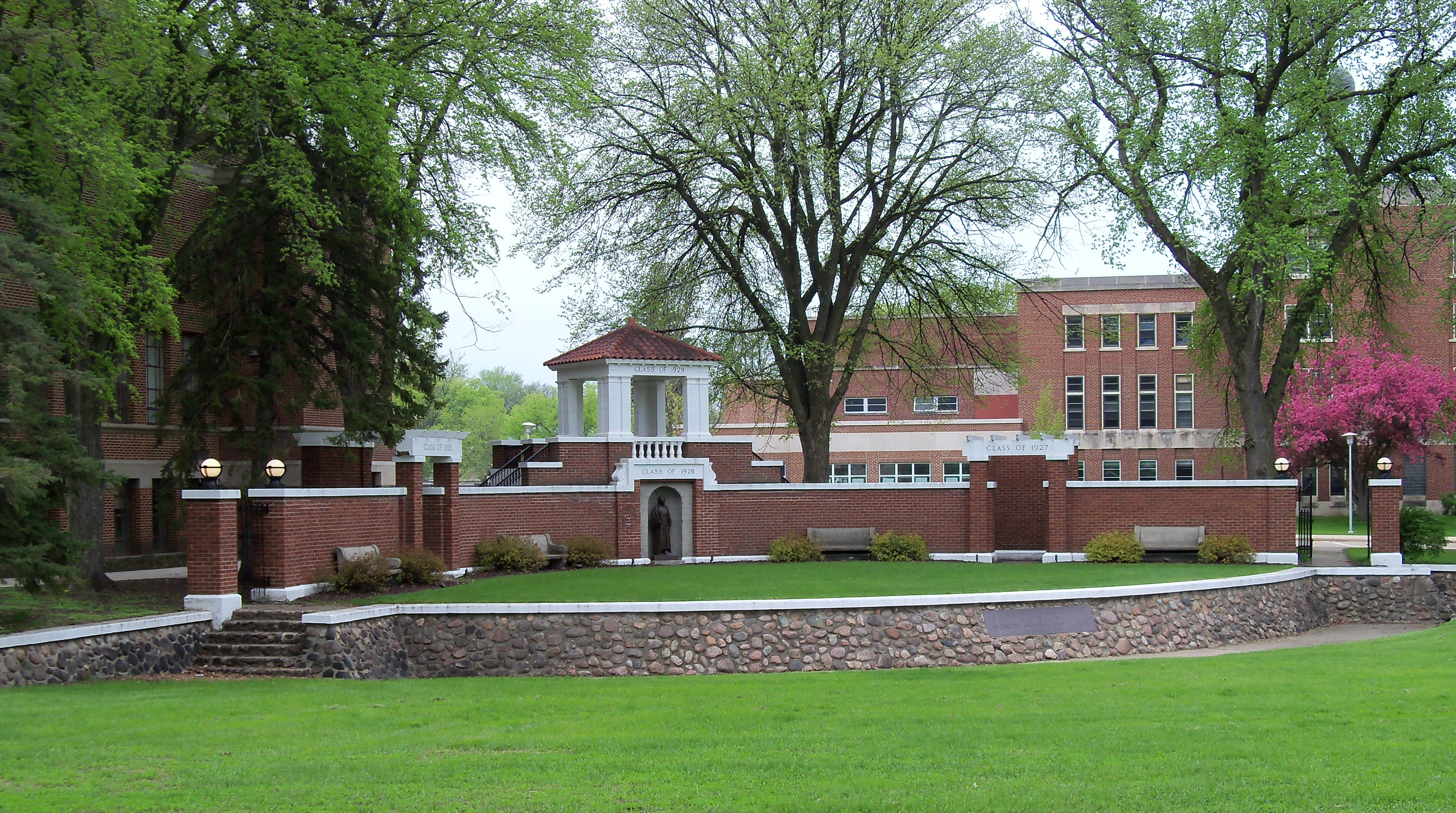
Coolidge Sylvan Theatre

The Hilton M. Briggs Library consists of more than 635,000 bound volumes, 315,000 government documents, 79,000 maps, and 1,800 journal titles (with 28,000 additional titles available online). Within the Briggs Library is the Daschle Research Library dedicated to former U.S. Senate Majority Leader Tom Daschle (SDSU BA 1969), which houses his Congressional papers.

== Academics ==
SDSU awards associate degrees, bachelor's degrees, master's degrees, and doctoral degrees. The university provides 200 fields of study. The university's colleges and schools include College of Agriculture, Food and Environmental Sciences; College of Arts, Humanities and Social Sciences; College of Education and Human Sciences; College of Natural Sciences; College of Nursing; College of Pharmacy & Allied Health Professions; Graduate School; Jerome J. Lohr College of Engineering; University College; and Van D. and Barbara B. Fishback Honors College.

=== Rankings ===
Academic rankings

National
- Forbes: 471
- U.S. News & World Report: 266
- Washington Monthly: 281
- WSJ/College Pulse: 501–600

Global
- U.S. News & World Report: 1446

For 2025, U.S. News and World Report rated South Dakota State University as the 149th Best Public University and the 266th Best National University overall.

=== Recognition ===
SDSU has been recognized as a Tree Campus USA annually since 2009.

South Dakota State University became the nation's ninth Purple Heart Campus in 2018.

=== Political Science Department ===
Political Science Alumni

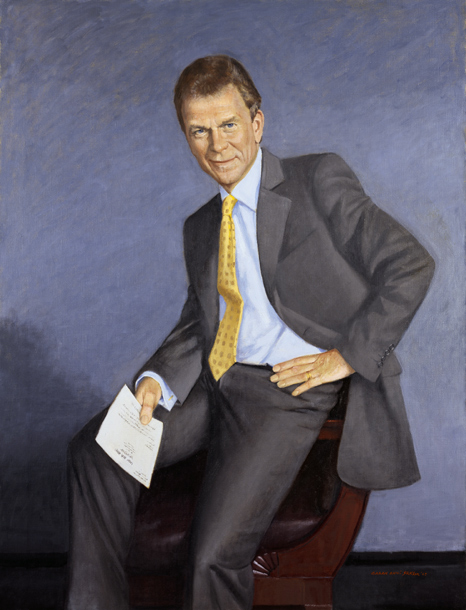
U.S. Senate Majority Leader
Tom Daschle

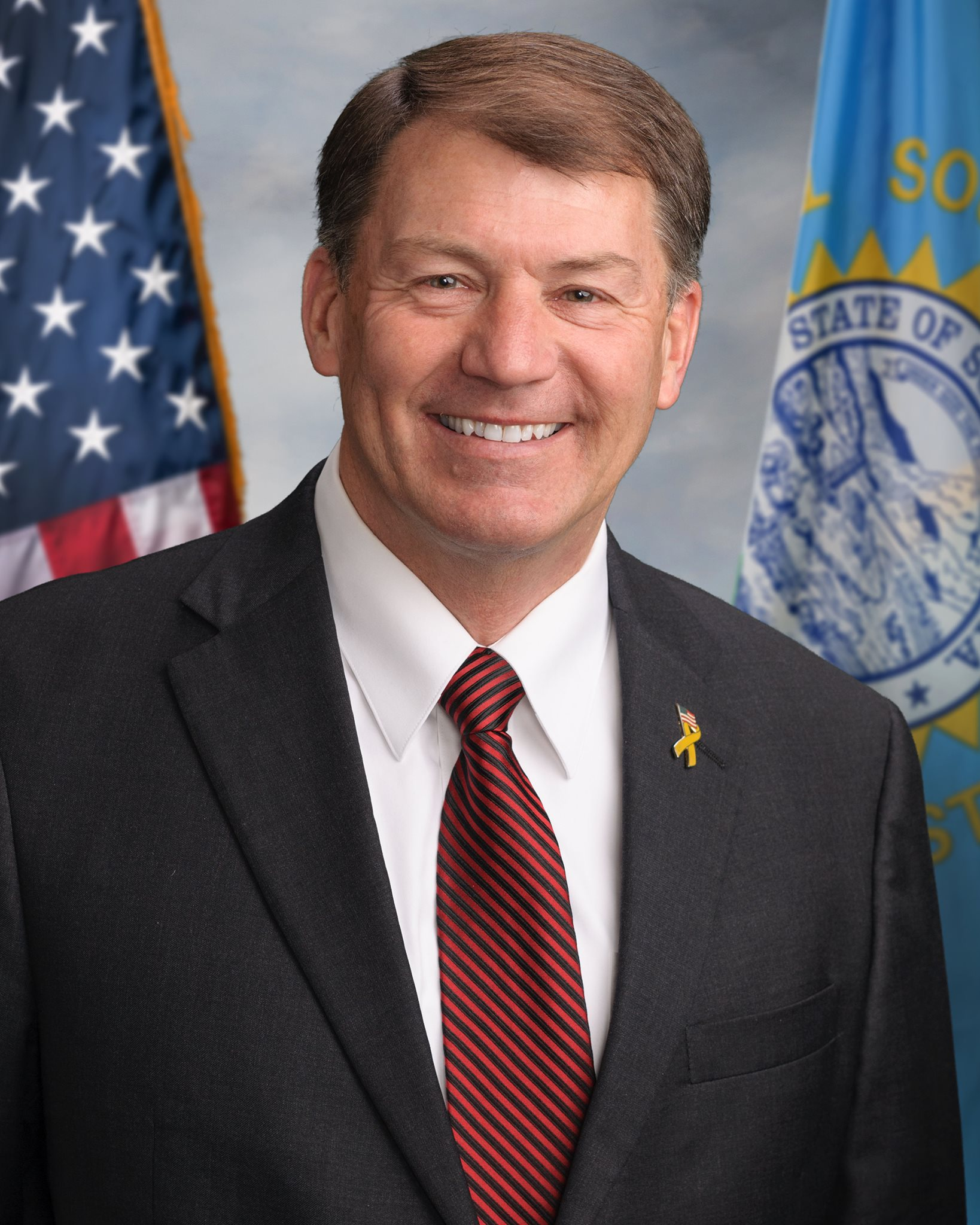
U.S. Senator
Mike Rounds

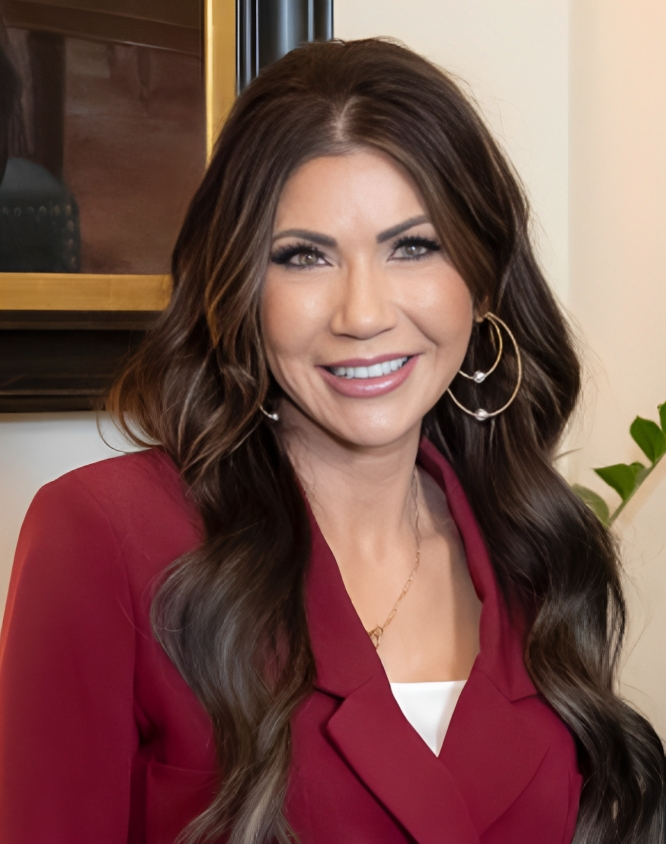
Special Envoy for the Shield of the Americas
Kristi Noem

A member of South Dakota's current Congressional delegation, the former U.S. Senate Majority Leader, and the Special Envoy for the Shield of the Americas are among the university's alumni.

Several alumni from SDSU's Department of Political Science have served as elected officials, including U.S. Senator Mike Rounds and former South Dakota governor Kristi Noem, and former U.S. Senate Majority Leader Tom Daschle. Former U.S. Representative Stephanie Herseth has served as a professor of the program. Two alumni were chosen as Truman Scholars in 2004 and 2006.

=== Department of Military Science ===
The Department of Military Science commissions officers into the United States Army and United States Air Force through the Reserve Officers' Training Corps program.

Some graduates have become general officers, including William E. DePuy, Jake Krull, Raymond W. Carpenter, Franklin J. Blaisdell, Mark A. Clark. Medal of Honor recipients Leo K. Thorsness and Willibald C. Bianchi attended the university.

Military Alumni

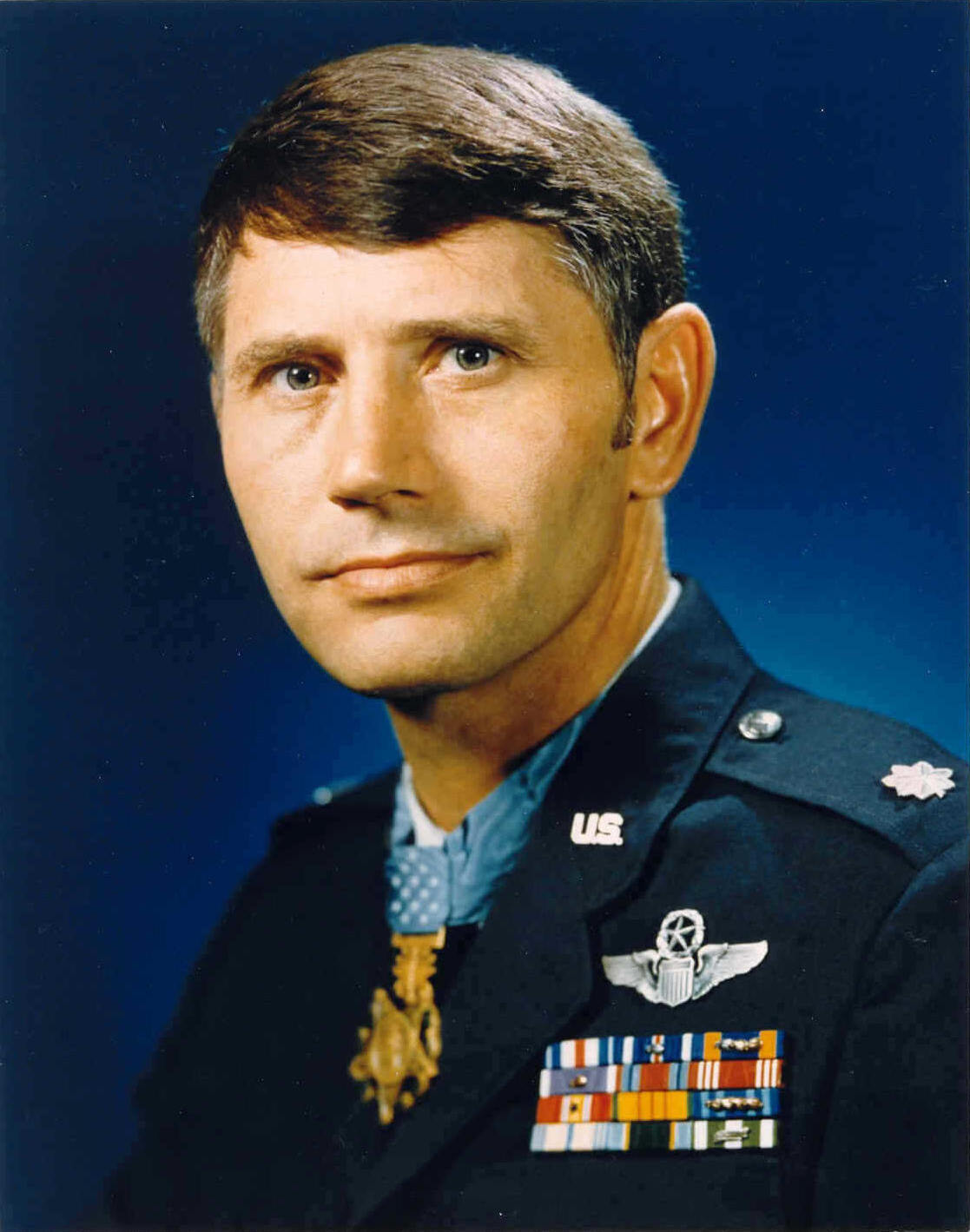
Medal of Honor recipient
Leo Thorsness

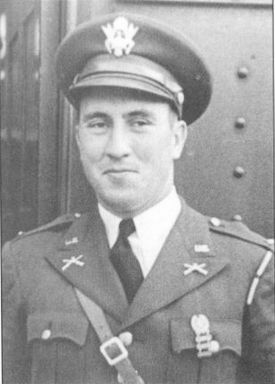
Medal of Honor recipient
Willibald C. Bianchi

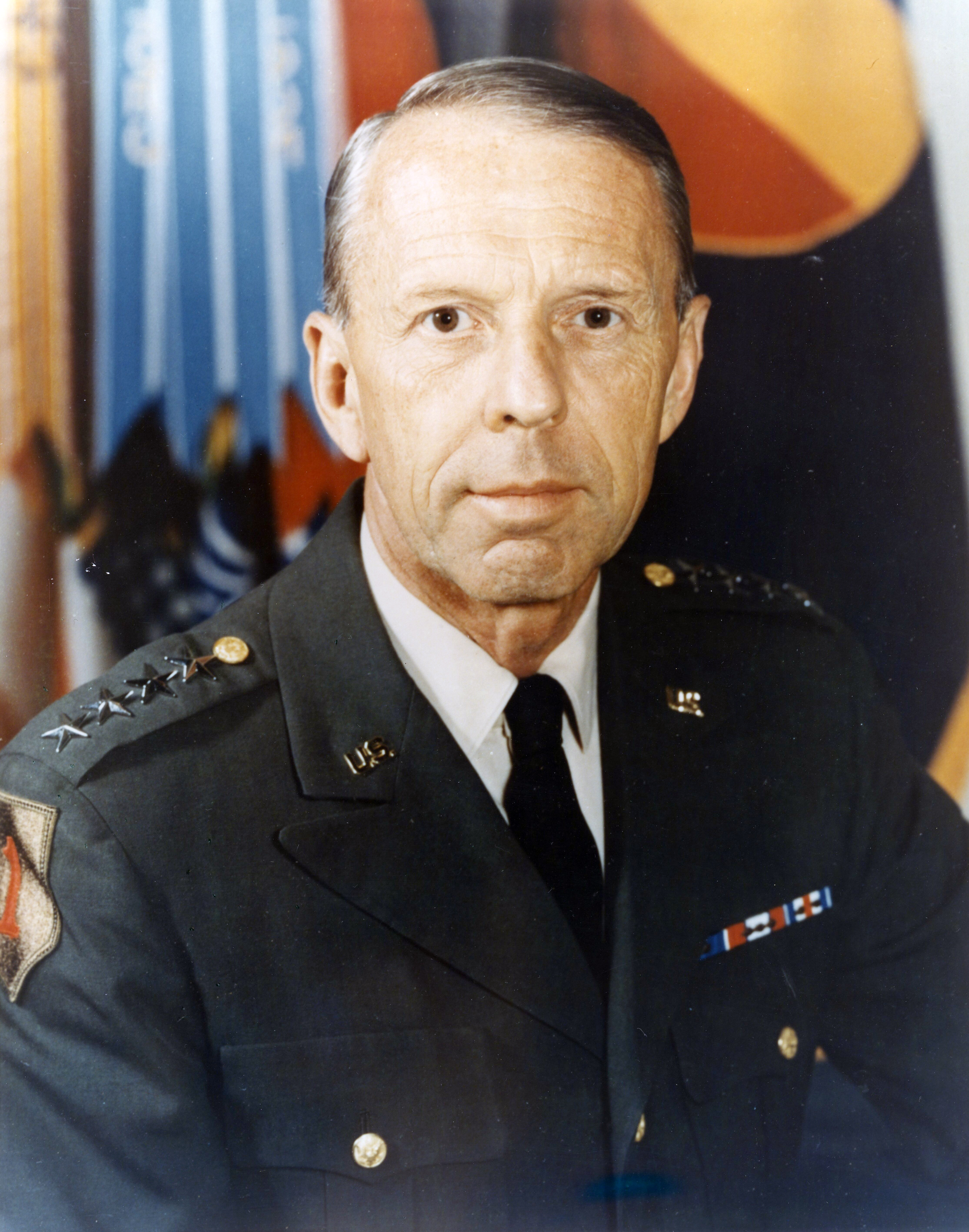
U.S. General
William E. DePuy

The Department has produced two Medal of Honor recipients as well as a plethora of U.S. Generals.

=== Research achievements ===
South Dakota State University currently ranks among the Midwest's top research universities, notably in the fields of agricultural science, biological science, and engineering. It is consistently listed in U.S. News & World Report's "Top 200 National Universities" in its college and university rankings. The campus is also home to the Geospatial Sciences Center of Excellence, a research and educational collaboration with United States Geological Survey Center for Earth Resources Observation and Science. The GSCE focuses on basic and applied research in terrestrial remote sensing. SDSU was recognized in 2017 by ShanghaiRanking Consultancy as the seventh most productive university in the US (and 27th globally) for remote sensing research for the period 2011–2015.

The university operates the South Dakota state agricultural research stations around the state, such as the Antelope Range and Livestock Research Station near Buffalo. The Great Plains Writers Conference is a venue for significant regional authors or writers interested in the Great Plains. It was instituted at SDSU in 1976 for writing scholarship.

Notable research achievements by alumni include:

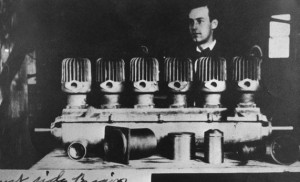
Stephen Foster Briggs '07 invented the Briggs & Stratton engine while a student at SDSU in 1906.

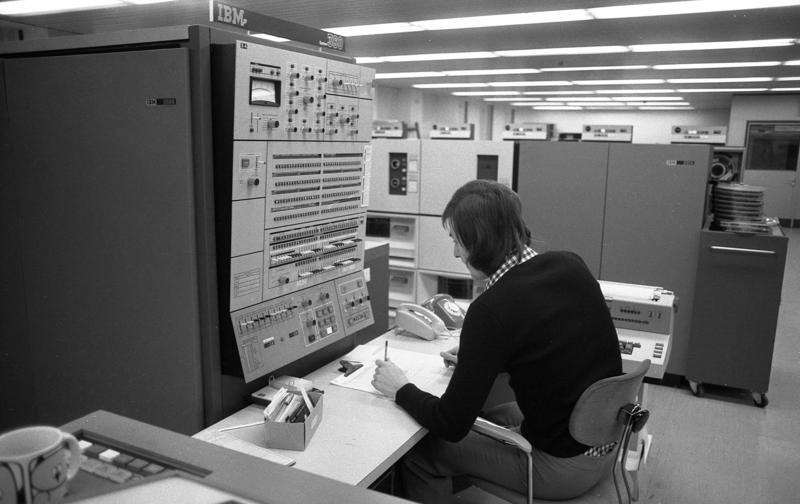
Gene Amdahl '48 was the chief architect of the IBM 360 computer in 1964.

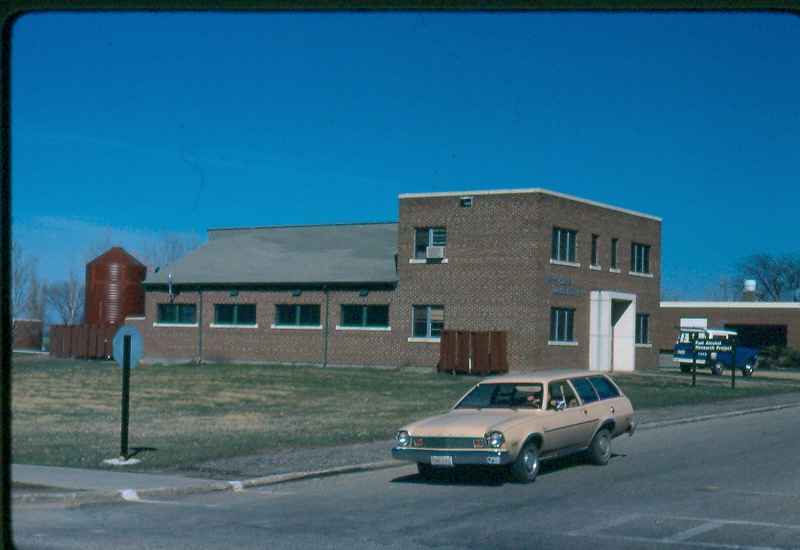
The first ethanol production facility in the United States was established at SDSU in 1979.

Alumni from the university's research community notable for scientific achievements include:

- Stephen Foster Briggs, B.S. 1907, invented the Briggs & Stratton internal-combustion engine
- Theodore Schultz, B.S. Economics & Agriculture 1928, received the 1979 Nobel Prize in Economics
- Gene Amdahl, B.S. Engineering & Physics, 1948, developed the IBM 360 computer and later the IBM 704, IBM 709 computers, and Amdahl's Law
- Aelred Kurtenbach and Duane Sander, electrical engineering professors, founded Daktronics, Inc.

== Student life ==
Undergraduate demographics as of Fall 2023
Race and ethnicity	Total
White	86%
Hispanic	3%
International student	3%
Unknown	3%
Two or more races	2%
American Indian/Alaska Native	1%
Asian	1%
Black	1%
Economic diversity
Low-income (Note: The percentage of students who received an income-based federal Pell grant intended for low-income students.)	19%
Affluent (Note: The percentage of students who are a part of the American middle class at the bare minimum.)	81%

=== Pride of the Dakotas Marching Band ===
The SDSU Marching Band, "The Pride of the Dakotas," was founded in 1890. It was given the special name the Millennium Band in 2000 by the South Dakota State Legislature, has marched in the 1981 and 1997 Presidential Inaugural Parades in Washington, D.C.; A Capital Fourth in 2000 in Washington, D.C.; the 2003 and 2008 Tournament of Roses Parade in Pasadena, California; and the Korean War Monument Dedication at the state's capital Pierre in 2004. In 2022, the marching band performed in the Macy's Thanksgiving Day Parade the same season they would perform at the FCS title game, seeing the football team win their first FCS National Championship.

=== Homecoming ===
The homecoming celebration, Hobo Day, has been dubbed "The Biggest One-Day Event in the Dakotas."

== Athletics ==
South Dakota State athletics monogram

South Dakota State participates in athletics as a member of NCAA Division I, which they became an active member of starting at the beginning of the 2008–09 academic year. South Dakota State's athletic conference affiliations include the Summit League for 16 sports teams, the Missouri Valley Football Conference (Division I FCS), the Big 12 Conference (wrestling) and the National Collegiate Equestrian Association.

The Jackrabbits have 19 varsity sports and numerous intramural and club teams. South Dakota State's athletic mascot for both the men's and women's teams is the Jackrabbit, both the men's and women's sports teams are officially referred to as the Jackrabbits.

=== Facilities ===
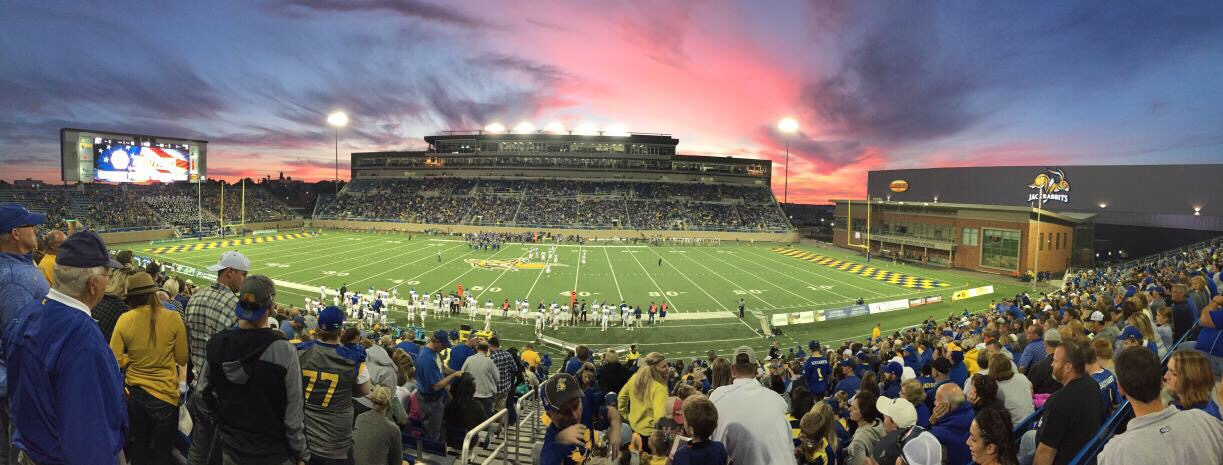
Dana J. Dykhouse Stadium

A 19,340-capacity stadium opened in the fall of 2016.

The Stiegelmeier Family Student-Athlete Center, located on the north end of the Dana J. Dykhouse Stadium, is the home of Jackrabbit football. It opened prior to the 2010 football season and houses an academic center equipped with study areas, computers, tutors, and other educational aids for all South Dakota State teams.

The Sanford Jackrabbit Athlete Complex, a state-of-the-art indoor practice and competition facility, opened October 11, 2014. It is immediately north of and attached to the Stiegelmeier Family Student-Athlete Center. The SJAC has bleacher seating for up to 1,000 spectators and can be used for track practice and track meets, football practice, softball and baseball practice, golf practice, and other events within the South Dakota State athletic department. It includes 149,284-square foot facility and features an eight-lane, 300-meter track, one of only five collegiate indoor tracks of that size in the nation.
