= Auto Red Bug =

Defunct American motor vehicle manufacturer

Automotive Electric Service Corp. (renamed) Automotive Standards, Inc.
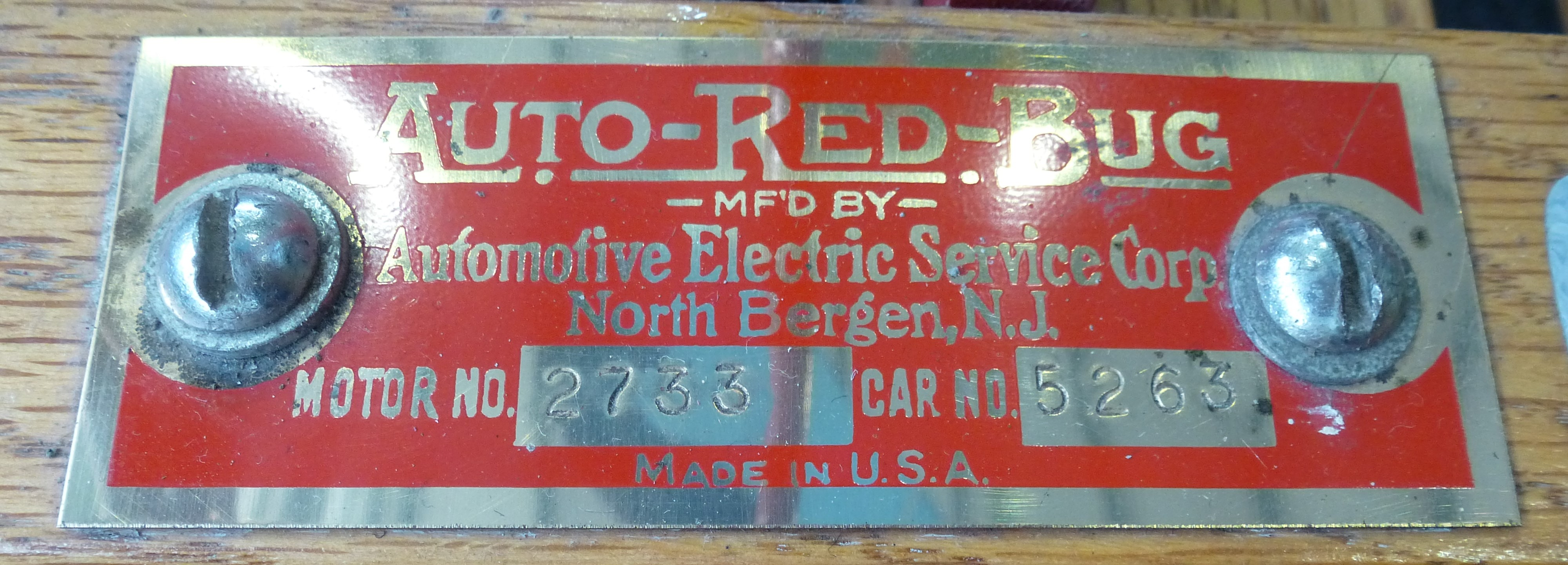
- Identification Plate for Red Bug

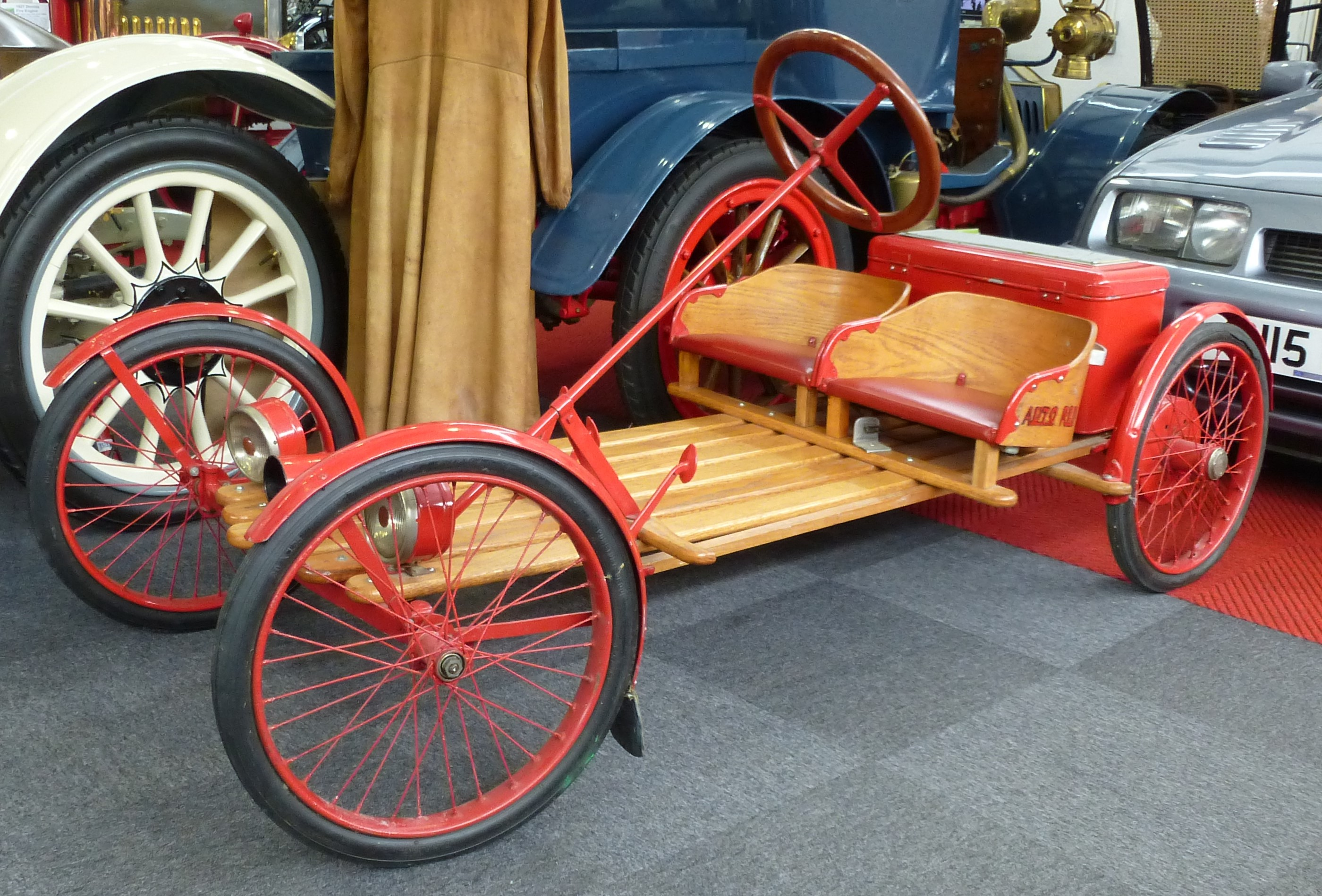
- 1924-1930 Auto Red Bug - Electric version
- Formerly: Briggs & Stratton Flyer, Smith Flyer
- Founded: 1924; 102 years ago
- Defunct: 1930; 96 years ago
- Fate: Discontinued
- Headquarters: North Bergen, New Jersey, United States

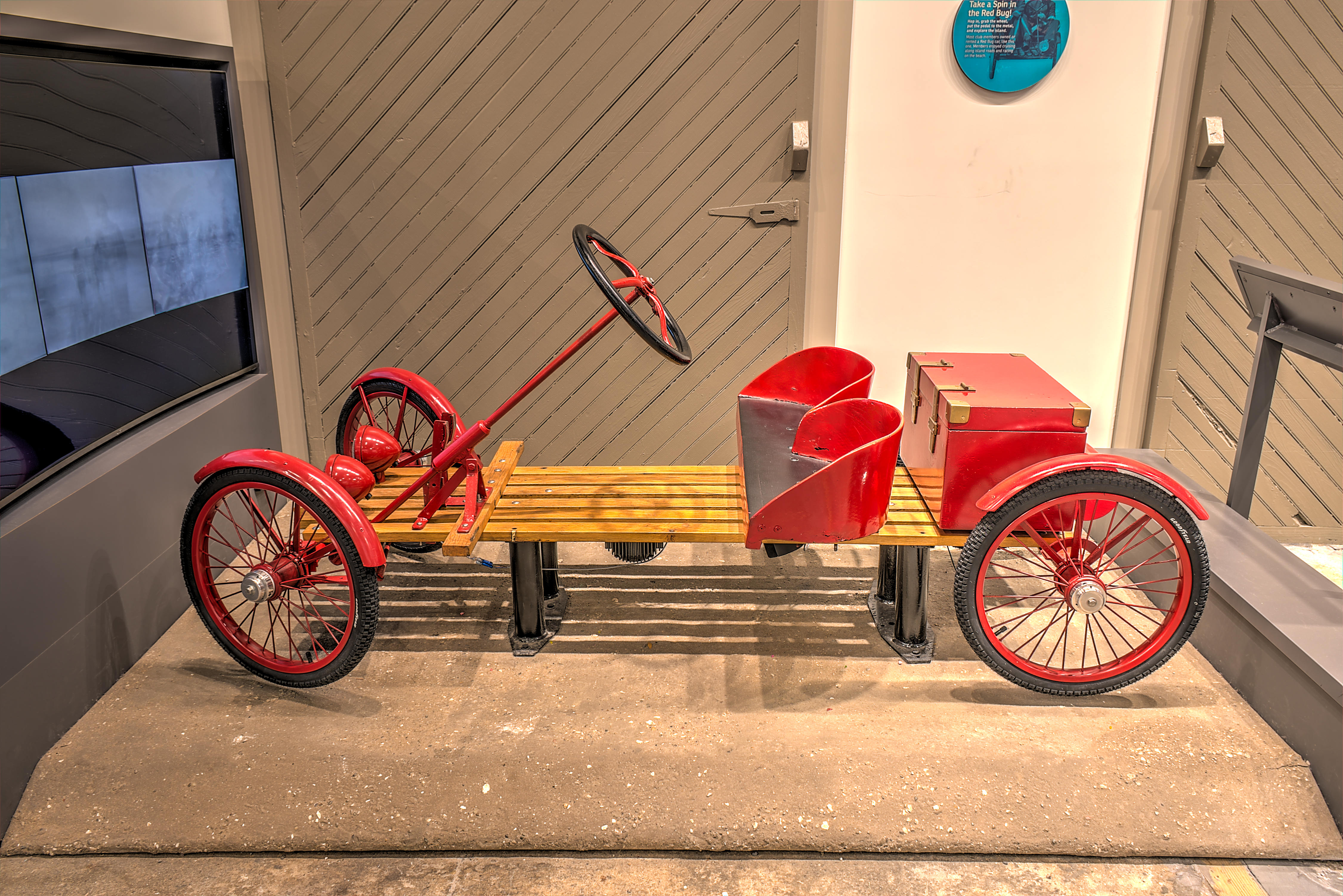
Exhibit at Jekyll Island Museum

The Red Bug, later marketed as the Auto Red Bug were a vintage era cyclecar automobile manufactured by the Automotive Electric Service Corp. of North Bergen, New Jersey from 1924 to 1930. It is considered an early version of a microcar.

== History ==
A. O. Smith developed the Smith Flyer with a fifth wheel, called the Smith Motor Wheel, driven by a gas engine. Manufactured in Lafayette, Indiana, by the American Motor Vehicle Company, from 1916 to 1919, A. O. Smith sold the rights to Briggs & Stratton who marketed the cyclecar as The Briggs & Stratton Flyer.

Briggs & Stratton sold the rights to the Flyer and Briggs & Stratton Motor Wheel to Automotive Electric Service Corp. in 1924 who continued to build it as the Red Bug. When the supply of gasoline engines ran low, a 12 volt electric version was produced. The electric version was built with four wheels, with one rear wheel driven by a Northeast electric motor, the same motor used for starting on contemporary Dodge Brothers automobiles.

Red Bugs and Auto Red Bugs were sold by Abercrombie & Fitch and others in the United States, as well as the United Kingdom and France. Priced at $150 (equivalent to $2,818 in 2025) from 1924, the small automobiles sold mostly as a novelty for the wealthy, but also for transportation within resorts and at amusement parks.

In 1930 there were reports that Indian Motorcycle Company would take over production of the Red Bug, but this did not occur since Indian itself was acquired by the duPonts.
