= American Motor Vehicle Company =

Defunct American motor vehicle manufacturer

- Industry: Automotive
- Founded: 1916
- Defunct: 1920
- Headquarters: Lafayette, Indiana
- Products: Auto Red Bug, American Junior

The American Motor Vehicle Company was founded in Lafayette, Indiana in 1916. It manufactured pedal cars and built the Auto Red Bug and American Junior automobile models 1916 and 1920.
