= Snapper Inc. =

American manufacturing company of lawn-care and snow-removal equipment

- Trade name: Snapper Inc.
- Industry: Agricultural
- Founded: 1894
- Headquarters: Wauwatosa, Wisconsin
- Area served: Europe, Middle East, Africa; limited availability in North America
- Owner: Briggs & Stratton (a subsidiary of KPS Capital Partners)
- Website: snapper.eu
- Footnotes; External links: Official Snapper website – Europe; Snapper website – United States (archived content, limited availability)

Snapper, Inc. is an American manufacturer of residential and professional lawn-care equipment, best known for its rear-engine riding mowers and early development of the self-propelled rotary lawn mower. The company was formerly based in McDonough, Georgia, but is now owned by Briggs & Stratton, which is headquartered in Wauwatosa, Wisconsin.

The Snapper name in the US is primarily associated with walk-behind mowers, such as the Hi-Vac and Ninja lines, as well as entry-level equipment available through major retailers. In North America, Snapper products are limited following Briggs & Stratton’s 2023 decision to end production of zero-turn mowers and tractors for that market segment.

In contrast, the Snapper brand remains active in Europe, the Middle East, and Africa (EMEA), where it offers a full product range under its own branding. This includes a series of European-built ride-on lawn tractors (launched in 2024 and 2025), as well as zero-turn mowers, walk-behind mowers, and battery-powered garden tools. Products are distributed through a dedicated regional dealer network and supported by local-language websites in multiple European markets.

== History ==
=== Origins and the Snappin’ Turtle (1894–1960s) ===
The company began in 1894 as Southern Saw Works. Later, in the 1940s, as the McDonough Power Company, it was acquired by William Raymond Smith, who changed the company's direction when the lumber industry declined.

Smith purchased the patent for a mowing blade design in 1950. With this, he created the "Snappin' Turtle," named so for the way it snapped the grass and for its turtle figurine on the top front of the first model. The Snappin’ Turtle was one of the first rotary blade mowers designed specifically for residential use, introduced in 1951.

Its compact size and manoeuvrability made it well suited to the growing number of suburban lawns in post-war America, a trend that shaped Snapper's early product development. While mostly known for their lawnmowers, Snapper also built tillers and snow blowers.

=== Expansion and Organisational Change (1967–1991) ===
In 1967, Snapper was acquired by Fuqua Industries. Under Fuqua's ownership, Snapper broadened its product range and expanded its manufacturing footprint. Sales rose from $10 million in 1967 to $260 million in 1987.

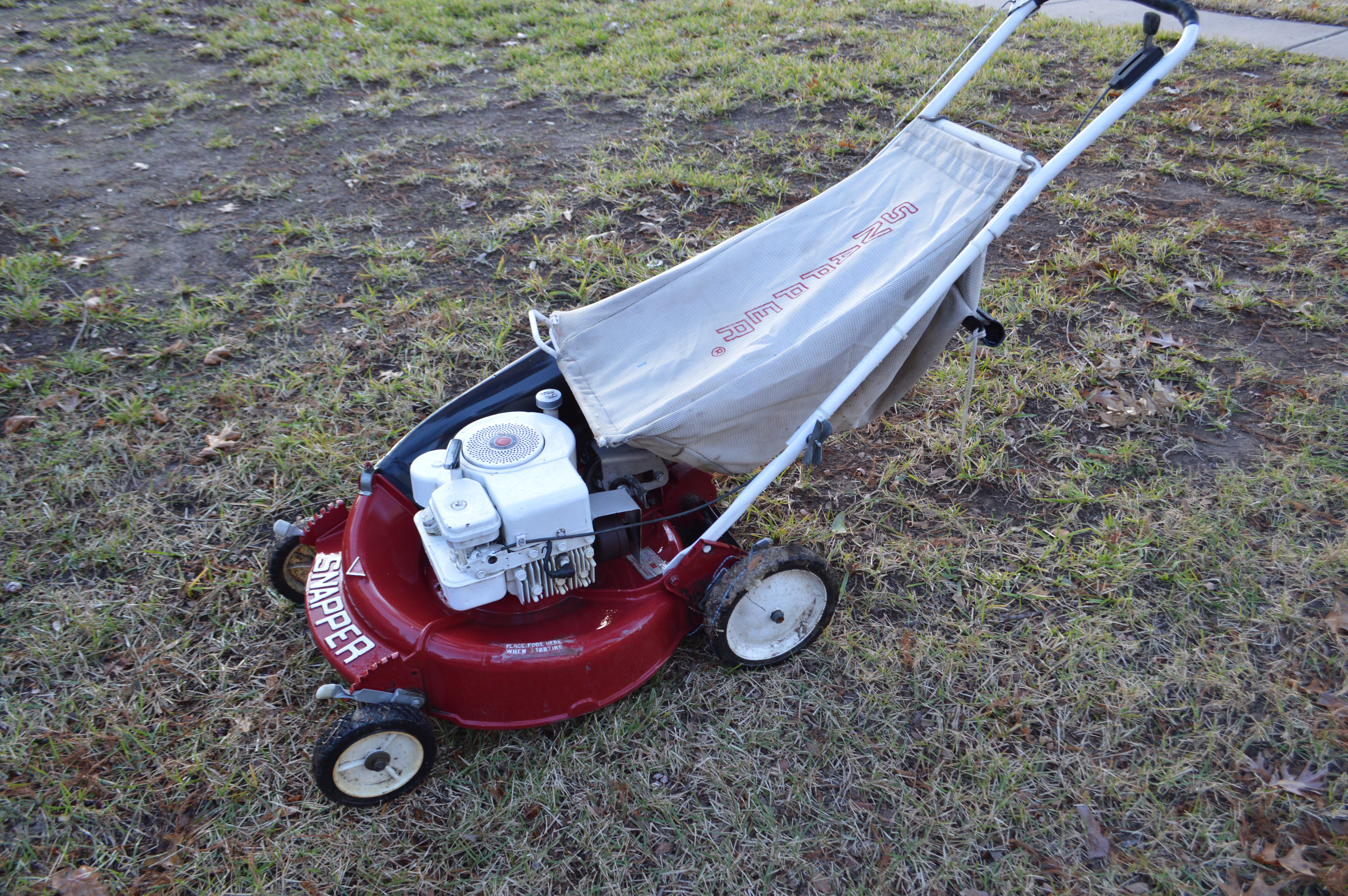
1970s Snapper lawnmower with aluminum deck

In 1976 McDonough Power Equipment registered the trademark Snapper, and adopted that name as its identity. Producing an assortment of yard-care tools, Snapper had facilities in McDonough, Georgia, Beatrice, Nebraska, and Fort Worth, Texas.

In 1991, Snapper announced the closing of the Texas and Nebraska factories; the Georgia factory was expanded to absorb the production. Fuqua President Lawrence Klamon explained the closures and consolidation by saying that most of the production from Fort Worth was going east of the Mississippi River.

=== Cultural Recognition (1990s) ===
One of Snapper's most recognisable machines, the Rear Engine Rider, would later gain pop culture recognition through its appearance in the 1994 film Forrest Gump. The mower appears in multiple scenes as Forrest maintains both municipal and residential lawns. This inclusion helped cement the machine's place as a cultural icon.

=== Acquisition by Simplicity and Briggs & Stratton (2002–2013) ===
In 2002 Snapper was acquired by Simplicity Manufacturing, which was then acquired by Briggs & Stratton in 2004. Since then the Snapper brand name has been added to products such as weed trimmers, hedge trimmers, leaf blowers, among others.

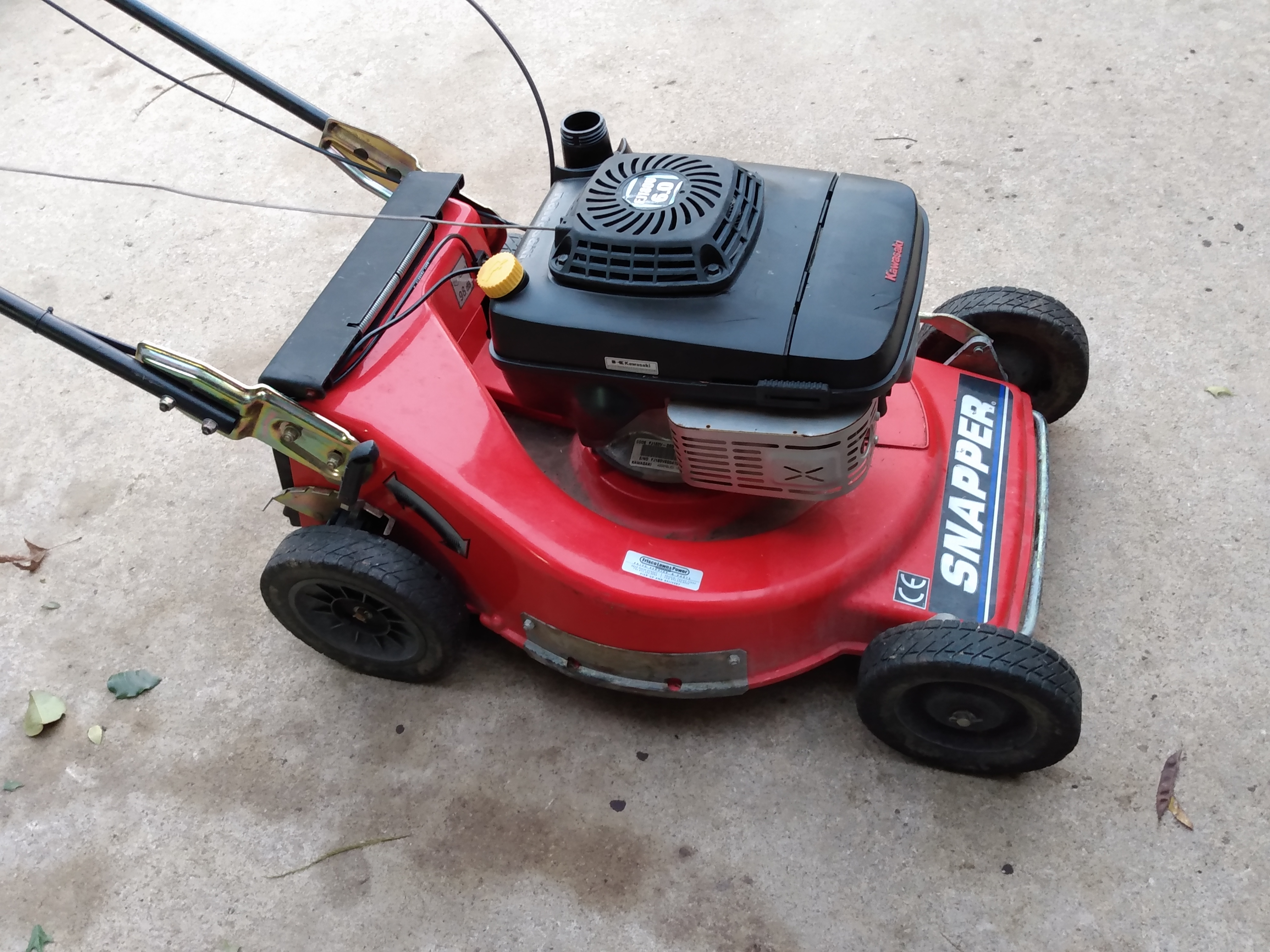
Snapper mower made by Simplicity

January 17, 2013, Briggs and Stratton announced they would be selling Snapper labelled mowers at WalMart. This was a reversal of a previous decision; when Snapper was independent, their CEO refused to do so.

=== Restructuring and North American Exit (2014–2023) ===
In 2014 Briggs & Stratton announced the plan to close the Snapper plant in McDonough, Georgia and move production to Briggs & Stratton's factory in Wauwatosa, Wisconsin, saying it made sense to fold the Georgia plant's Snapper operations into the Wauwatosa factory near the company's headquarters where engineering, product research and other departments support manufacturing.

In 2019 Briggs & Stratton announced a plan to restructure the company. This included divesting the final product divisions and concentrating on providing engines and stationary generators. The plan includes selling the Snapper and Snapper Pro lines along with the other brands Ferris, Simplicity, Billy Goat, and the pressure washer and portable generator business, with these sales expected to be complete by the end of 2020.

In July 2020, Briggs & Stratton filed for Chapter 11 bankruptcy and was acquired by private equity firm KPS Capital Partners, which purchased substantially all company assets, including the Snapper brand. Under KPS ownership, Briggs & Stratton continued operating Snapper and its other key brands.

In September 2023, Briggs and Stratton announced the end of production for four zero-turn mowers and all lawn tractors in North America, citing "due to the considerable year-over-year market decline for the tractor segment".

=== Continuation of the Snapper brand in EMEA (2023–present) ===
Despite the end of lawn tractor and zero-turn production in North America, Snapper remains active in the EMEA region, where it continues to manufacture and sell a dedicated product line. This includes European-built ride-on mowers, developed specifically to meet the needs of local users and terrain.

The brand is represented by a strong network of over 30 authorised distributors across more than 30 countries, including France, Germany, the United Kingdom, Ireland, Spain, Saudi Arabia, and South Africa. Several of these distributors actively promote Snapper equipment on their websites, such as FGM Claymore in the United Kingdom, Irish Farm & Garden Machinery Ltd., AgriEuro, and FIABA S.R.L. in Italy.

Following the discontinuation of lawn tractor and zero-turn production in North America, the brand introduced two new series of European-built ride-on mowers in 2024: the RTX and RPX lines. This was followed in 2025 by the launch of the RTX HD and XD high-dump models.

In 2026, Snapper expanded its European product portfolio with the introduction of two fully electric ride-on mowers, the ERX96 Electric Riding Mower and the EZX107 Electric Zero Turn Mower, marking the brand's entry into the electric ride-on segment within the EMEA market. The launch represented a diversification of the company's traditional petrol-powered offering and aligned with increasing demand for lower-emission garden equipment in residential settings.

In the same year, Snapper introduced the SRX85 Compact High-Grass Mower, a petrol-powered lawn tractor designed for taller grass and less frequently maintained areas. The model broadened the brand's appeal to users with orchards, holiday properties, and other semi-rural applications.

== Mascot ==
Snapper's long-standing mascot, Snapper Sam, has been part of the brand's identity since the 1950s. Originally inspired by the cast iron turtle head ornament featured on early "Snappin’ Turtle" mowers, Sam evolved into a cartoon turtle and was widely used in Snapper's advertising and branding throughout the late 20th century.

The character was phased out in the late 2000s but made a return in 2021 as part of a brand refresh celebrating Snapper's 70th anniversary. The relaunch included a new logo, updated website, and the launch of Sam's Garden Blog, where Snapper Sam shares lawn care tips and product advice.

== Former locations ==
- 535 Macon St, McDonough, Georgia
- Beatrice, Nebraska
- 5000 South Fwy, Fort Worth, Texas
