= Muriel Hind =

British motorcyclist and motorist

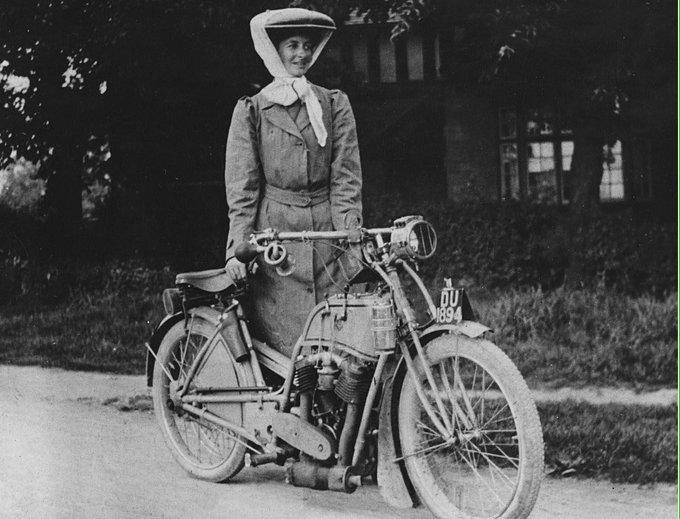
- Muriel and bike
- Born: Agnes Muriel Hind; 27 May 1882; Dorset
- Died: 3 May 1956 (aged 73); Corley
- Other name: Muriel Lord
- Occupations: motorcyclist, motorist, rally driver
- Spouse: Richard Lord (m. 1912)

Muriel Hind (27 May 1882 – 3 May 1956) was a pioneering British motorcyclist and motorist described as "the first woman motorcyclist in England". She competed in trials in vehicles with two, three, and four wheels.

== Early life ==
Agnes Muriel Hind was born on 27 May in Dorset in 1882, but orphaned at seven years of age. Known as Muriel, she and her brother were raised by relatives in Swanage. She enjoyed playing hockey and became interested in bicycling in the 1890s but reported in 1904 that she found it "too slow" now. Her family were early adopters of motorcycles and her uncle Edward was a pioneering early motorcyclist. Her brother took up motorcycling too and this encouraged the young Muriel Hind to acquire and ride a simple motorcycle between 1901 and 1903.

== Motorcycling ==
Hind later said she took up motorcycling because she "thought she would like to". Her first motorcycle was a Singer, basically a motorised dropped frame bicycle, with a 2 hp Motor Wheel added to the back wheel. The design was developed by Edwin Perks and Frank Birch of Coventry.

== Involvement in motorsport ==
Hind gradually increased the horsepower of her motorcycles, and by 1905 she was a member of the Motor Cycling Club and living in London. Hind started to take part in competitive riding, hill climb and driving events. She drove a Singer Tricar in the 1906 Land's End to John O'Groats Trial, with aviation pioneer Hilda Hewlett as her passenger and mechanic. She also drove a tricar in the twenty-four-hour London to Edinburgh Trial, again with a female passenger, making good time in torrential rain.

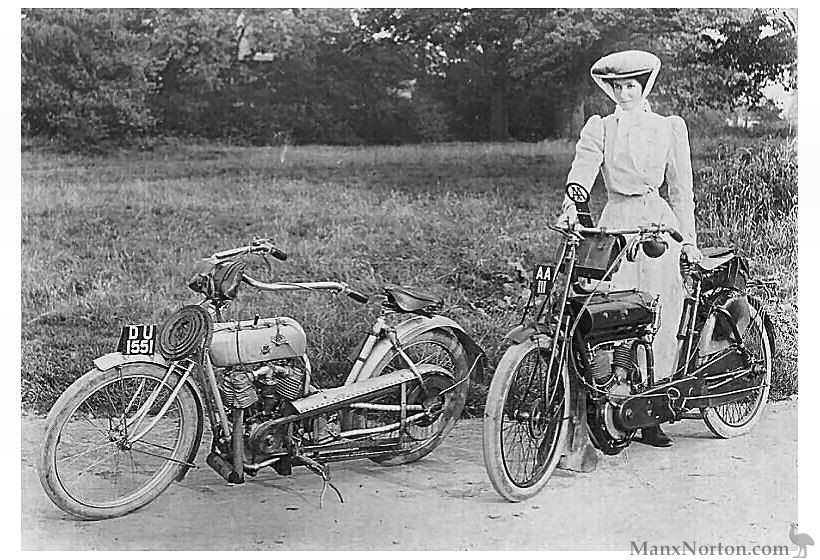
Roc at Right and Rex on the left with Muriel Hind in about 1907

In 1907, AW Wall of Roc created a V-twin engined motorcycle to her specifications of a dropped (lady's) frame.

Hind then moved to Coventry and became more deeply involved in motorcycling and motoring, the industry around which was expanding in the area. She became associated with the motorcycle makers, Rex Motor Manufacturing Co. one of a number of keen to exploit a growing market for lady’s motorcycles. Hind became a demonstrator, works, and test rider for Rex, and by 1910 they had created the Blue Devil for her, the fastest machine she had yet ridden. Known as " the devil's own job" to start, the name inspired the company to paint a blue devil on the petrol tank.

Although best known for her motorcycling exploits, Hind also drove three and four-wheeled vehicles. A 1909 article in Car Illustrated listed her other vehicles as including “a 9hp singer tri-car” and as well as “her stud of motorcycles" and reported that she "has just disposed of her 18hp Deasy before taking delivery of a 35hp of the same make. It is needless to add that Miss Hind is her own driver and mechanic.” In 1931, she recalled that she had owned 12 different motorcycles.

== Motor journalism ==
Hind regularly appeared in the motorcycle press, which chose to publish photographs of her riding or posing with her latest motorcycle. She always appeared dressed very respectably, with a hat, veil, boots laced to the knee, long coat, and skirts, usually in tweeds, in the Edwardian fashion. She started writing a column, ‘The Lady Motorcyclist’ in Motorcycling magazine. Her first piece, published on 2 May 1910, explained why she loved motorcycling.

“I like the feeling of power, life, the mighty rushing wind beating on one’s cheeks with the roar of the passing breeze and the beat of the exhaust deafening one’s ear. This is the power that drives and here is the motorcycle’s charm. But I am waxing too garrulous and must throttle down to legal limit or else the Editor will extend a warning hand and bid me stop.”

By October that year, Hind's column was promoted to a fortnightly one. “Now that more ladies are taking up motorcycling, and either viewing the pastime from the seat of a passenger machine or actively participating in it on a lady’s motor-bicycle, we are to be given a regular page once a fortnight.”

== Personal life ==
Hind met Dick (Richard) Lord, her husband while working for Rex motorcycles. He had ridden Rex motorcycles in the Isle of Man TT races in 1909, 1910, and 1911. The couple married in 1912, and both gave up competing, although Hind, now known as Mrs. Muriel Lord, continued writing about motorcycling for some time. Their son Brian was born in 1915 and Dick set up the Coventry Motor Mart Company after the First World War.

By 1930, the couple were living in Wall Hill Hall in Corley, Warwickshire. In 1931, Muriel Lord was the first woman to be elected into the Association of Pioneer Motor Cyclists, membership of which was confined to those who held a license before December 31, 1904. In 1950 she was made an honorary life member of the Motor Cycle Club.

In the 1939 England and Wales Register, Hind was listed as Mrs. M. Agnes Lord and recorded as chairman of the local WVS and her husband as a retired engineer.

The Blue Devil motorcycle was acquired by the Murray's Motor Cycle Museum on the Isle of Man in the 1950s, although its engine had been borrowed to power a lawn mower at the Lords' home in the intervening years.

Agnes Muriel Lord died on 3 May 1956 at Whitley Hospital in Corley.
