= American Junior (automobile) =

The American Junior was made by American Motor Vehicle Company of Lafayette, Indiana from 1916 to 1920. Also known simply as the American, it was an ultra-light two-seat vehicle with a one-cylinder engine. It was mainly intended to be sold for children. Its manufacturers hoped to compete with rickshaws in China and to produce electric vehicles for invalids.
