= Harold M. Stratton =

American engineer and businessman

Harold Meade Stratton (November 12, 1879 – March 14, 1962) was an American engineer and businessman. He was president of the Stratton Grain Company, as well as co-founder and chairman of the Briggs & Stratton engine manufacturers.

== Biography ==
Stratton was born November 12, 1879, in Troy Center, Wisconsin. He graduated from the Milwaukee Business College and became a grain merchant in the late 19th century. Stratton's grain trade thrived during the early 20th century and would continue to be his main enterprise. A friend's introduction to Stephen Foster Briggs would be his legacy.

In 1908 Briggs and Stratton was founded to capitalize on the growing automobile industry. One of the earliest collaborations was the Briggs & Stratton Flyer, but the company eventually settled on automotive components and small internal combustion engines.

Stratton spent most of his time as president of the Stratton Grain Company, but served as chairman of the Briggs and Stratton Corporation until his death on March 14, 1962, in Milwaukee, Wisconsin.

== Legacy ==
Today, the Stratton Grain Company is no longer in operation. But Briggs & Stratton and Strattec Security are publicly traded companies.
