= Briggs & Stratton Raptor =

Line of flathead engines

The Briggs & Stratton Raptor series is a line of single-cylinder, four-cycle flathead engines. The series includes:

- Raptor 1: an industrial-based 3-horsepower flathead Model 13 engine introduced in the early 1970s.
- Raptor II: Released in the 1980s, it introduced the aluminum-bore dual-bearing block and had four horsepower standard. A cast-aluminum connecting rod decreased internal mass and extended engine life. It was designed after the company's kart-racing engines but without the racing parts.
- Raptor III: The final Raptor variant, released in 1995, had five horsepower and added a cast-alloy crank with a carbon-infused piston. It is the best-selling kart-racing engine of all time; hundreds of thousands remain in service.
- BlockZilla: The block is about 6 lb (2.7 kg) heavier and has more structural integrity. The exhaust and intake ports are set on an angle.
