= Simplicity Manufacturing Company =

American manufacturer of lawn and garden equipment

- Company type: Subsidiary
- Industry: Lawn and garden equipment
- Founded: 1922
- Founder: William J. Niederkorn
- Headquarters: Port Washington, Wisconsin, U.S.
- Area served: Worldwide
- Products: Lawn tractors, garden tractors, zero-turn mowers, outdoor power equipment
- Brands: Simplicity, Snapper, Ferris, Giant-Vac
- Owner: Briggs & Stratton
- Parent: Briggs & Stratton
- Website: www.simplicitymfg.com

Simplicity Manufacturing Company is an American manufacturer of lawn and garden equipment based in Port Washington, Wisconsin. Established in 1922 by William J. Niederkorn, the company is known for producing high-quality residential and commercial lawn tractors, garden tractors, and zero-turn mowers under several brand names. Simplicity introduced its first walk-behind two-wheeled tractor in 1939 and later developed the Wonderboy, its first riding mower, in 1957, which helped popularize small-scale mechanized lawn care in the United States.

== History ==
The company was founded by William J. Niederkorn in 1922, and started building walk-behind two-wheeled tractors in 1939. Between 1941 and 1945, due to World War II, Simplicity Manufacturing temporarily halted production of lawn and garden products, and manufactured electric fence controllers and external surface grinders to satisfy the War Production Board. Simplicity built is first riding tractor in 1957 which was the model Wonderboy.

The company rapidly expanded its product line in the sixties to meet the demands of the population shift to American suburbs. Allis-Chalmers purchased the company in 1965, and Simplicity's management bought it back in 1983. Simplicity Manufacturing celebrated its 75th anniversary in 1997 with a special 75th anniversary tractor model. The tractor featured a special blue paint scheme with chrome Harley-Davidson lights and muffler.

Sometime after AGCO Corporation purchased Deutz-Allis from Deutz-Fahr and KHD, Simplicity took over building and selling the Deutz-Allis lawn equipment. The name was later changed to Agco-Allis, and then to AGCO to reflect the changes within the AGCO Corporation.

After AGCO purchased Massey Ferguson, Simplicity began building and selling the Massey Ferguson lawn equipment. Simplicity bought the Snapper company in 2002. Snapper had built Massey Ferguson lawn tractors many years before.

Over the years, Simplicity has also built lawn and garden tractors for J.C. Penney, Montgomery Ward, Viking (part of Stihl), Homelite Corporation and Rapid. Hinomoto/Toyosha built some of the larger compact tractors sold as Simplicity, Deutz-Allis and Allis-Chalmers.

== Acquisitions ==
- 1989, purchased the Middlesworth company of Greentown, Indiana, a manufacturer of zero-turn mowers
- 2000 Simplicity announced that it had agreed to purchase Ferris Industries
- 2000 purchased Giant-Vac
- 2002, purchased the Snapper company
- 2004, was purchased by Briggs & Stratton
