= Buckboard =

American flat carriage or wagon with no springs

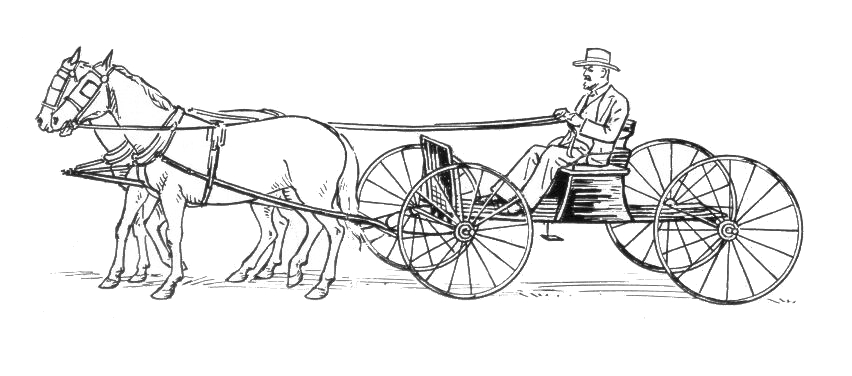
Buckboard

A buckboard is an American four-wheeled horse-drawn vehicle of simple construction. It has long, thin boards running from the front to the rear axle which act as its suspension. It was a common vehicle in the American West and in the mountainous East.

== Design ==
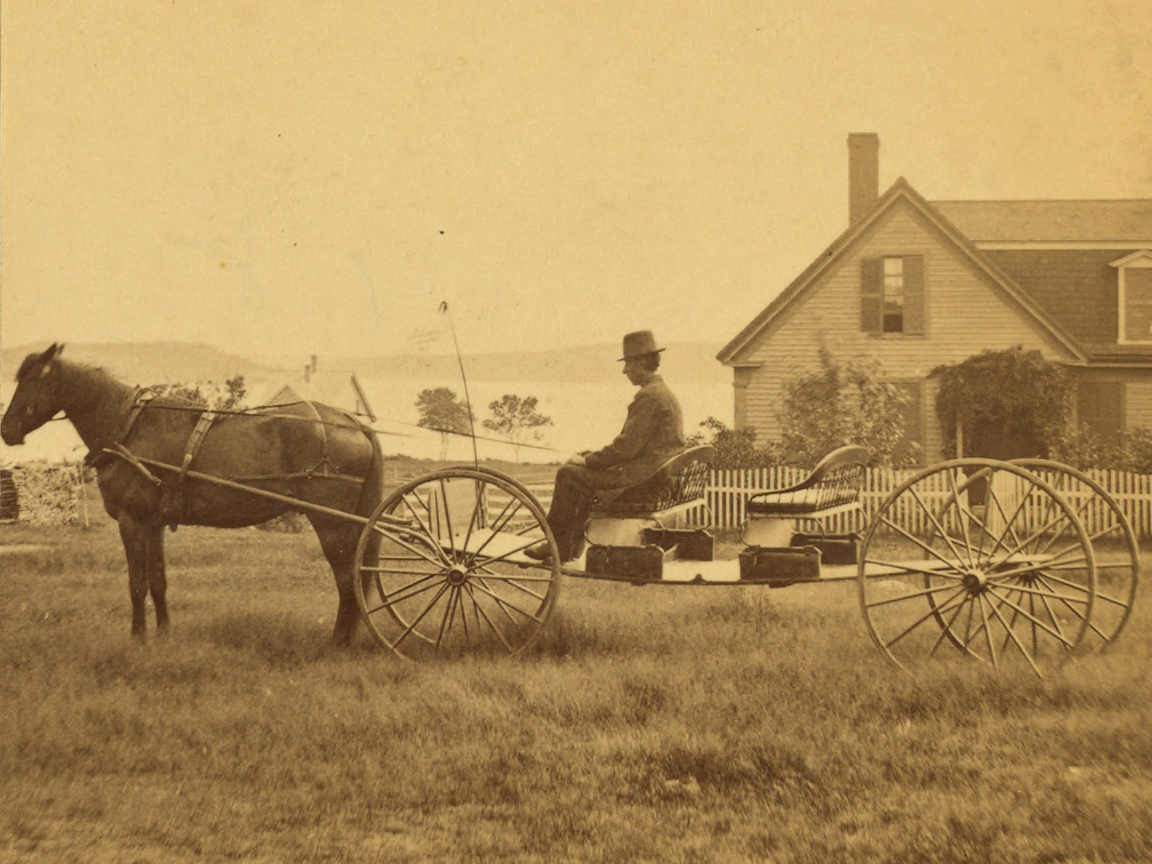
A long buckboard with two seats. Note the boards lay directly on the axles without springs.

Buckboards are pulled by one or two horses and, depending on the length, can accommodate 1, 2 or 3 seats. The primary characteristic of the buckboard is that the body of the vehicle is made by one or more thin boards spanning from the front to the rear axle. These boards act as the method of suspension, and it has been said that the buckboard is as comfortable to ride as a similar vehicle of rigid floor and steel springs for suspension.

Early versions have seats mounted on risers attached to the floor, and no sideboards, dashboard or tailgate. Later versions sometimes include a dashboard made of wood, elliptic springs mounted to the bottom of the seats, and other metal springs between the body-floor and axles. Modern versions may be built with readily available buggy-construction parts, such as a dashboard made of leatherette upholstery on an iron frame.

=== Variations ===
The buckboard wagon is a type of buggy based on the springboard floor plan, but shortened in length, and sometimes has a rail around the bed to contain loads.

The word "buckboard" became as common as the word "buggy" and has been used to describe all manner of horse-drawn vehicles that are not buckboards. When a vehicle is built with solid, rigid sideboards and a tailboard or tailgate, it is not a buckboard. Vehicles that are commonly mistaken for buckboards include the American buggy, spring wagon, runabout, and many ranch wagons with high sides.

== Historical context ==
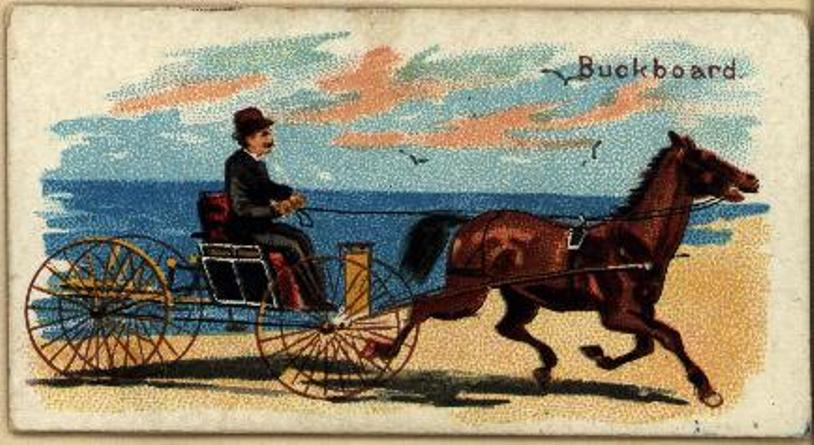
Duke's cigarettes advertising insert card, 1850–1920

The buckboard was invented by Reverend Cyrus Comstock, a travelling preacher living in Lewis, Essex County, New York who established many churches in the area during the early 1800s.

Originally designed for personal transportation in the Adirondack Mountains, these vehicles were widely used in newly settled regions of the United States.

== Legacy ==
In the early 20th century, as horse-drawn vehicles were supplanted by the motor car, the term 'buckboard' was also used in reference to a passenger car (usually a 'tourer') from which the rear body had been removed and replaced with a load-carrying bed. These home-built dual-purpose passenger- and load-carrying vehicles were the precursors of the factory-built 'utility' or 'pickup truck'.

A further "buckboard" example are Cyclecars, such as the Smith Flyer, that were also referred to as 'Buckboard Cars'.

The community of Rowland Heights, California has an annual parade commemorating Buckboard Days.
