= Magnetek =

Digital Power and Motion Control Systems Supplier

Magnetek, Inc.
- Experts in Digital Power and Motion Control Systems
- Type: Subsidiary
- Traded as: Nasdaq: MAG
- Industry: Material handling Power control and motion control technologies
- Founded: 1984; 42 years ago
- Headquarters: Menomonee Falls, Wisconsin, United States
- Number of locations: 3 Offices
- Area served: Worldwide
- Products: Drives and controls for material handling, people-moving and energy delivery
- Number of employees: 350
- Parent: Columbus McKinnon
- Website: www.columbusmckinnon.com/Magnetek/

Magnetek, Inc., is a technology company founded in 1984 and headquartered in Menomonee Falls, Wisconsin, and is a NASDAQ Global Market listed company. The company develops, manufactures, and markets digital power and motion control systems for material handling, people-moving and mining applications. Its power control systems serve the needs of selected niches of traditional and emerging commercial markets that are becoming increasingly dependent on "smart" power. Magnetek operates four ISO9001:2008 certified research and manufacturing facilities in North America.

The company is America's largest supplier of motor control, radio controls, and automation systems for industrial cranes and hoists. It is also the world's largest independent builder of digital motion control systems for elevators, holding this position by designing and manufacturing motion control subsystems. The company's mining division focuses on coal mining by building a hydraulic drive system that enables mining equipment to recover coal for refinement to produce "clean coal" energy.

== Business Areas ==
Magnetek currently primary areas of business:

- Material Handling
- People Moving
- Mining

== Company history ==
- 1984 – Magnetek is formed through the LBO of Litton's Magnetics Group, including Louis Allis Drives & Systems.
- 1985 – Magnetek acquires Power Controls Corp., Pittsburgh, Pa.
- 1986 – Magnetek acquires Century Electric with Yaskawa drives distribution franchise in U.S.
- 1991 – Magnetek acquires Plessey Valdarno in Italy.
- 1999 – Magnetek sells Century Electric, Magnetek acquires Electromotive Systems and Mondel Engineering.
- 2000 – Magnetek acquires J-Tec, Inc.
- 2001 – Magnetek acquires ADS, Inc. and sells drives distribution and lighting businesses, Elevator Products business moves to Menomonee Falls, Wisconsin.
- 2002 – Magnetek acquires LAB Communications
- 2003 – Magnetek acquires Telemotive Industrial Controls; Power Conversion and Alternative Energy businesses move to Menomonee Falls, Wisconsin.
- 2004 – Magnetek relocates Telemotive business to Menomonee Falls, Wisconsin.
- 2006 – Magnetek announces the divestiture of its Power Electronics Group headquartered in Italy. Worldwide headquarters moved to Menomonee Falls, Wisconsin.
- 2008 – Magnetek acquires Enrange, LLC.
- 2009 – Magnetek announces divestiture of Telecom Power Business
- 2015 – Magnetek is acquired by Columbus McKinnon Corporation

== Divisions ==
- Magnetek Elevator
- Magnetek Material Handling
- Magnetek Mining
