= Smith Flyer =

Defunct American motor vehicle manufacturer

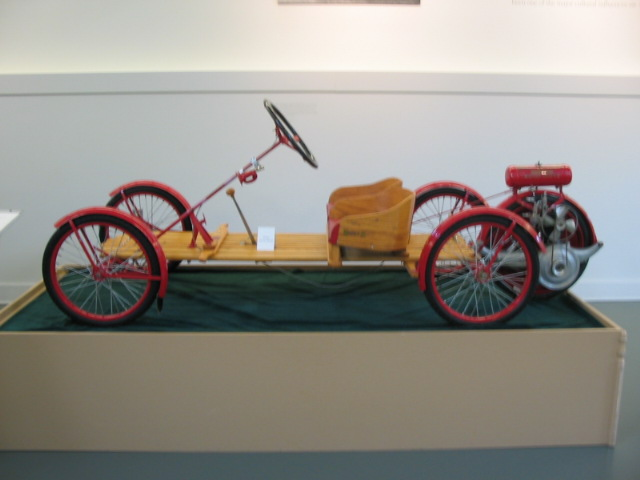
- Smith Flyer

Overview
- Type: Buckboard automobile, cyclecar
- Manufacturer: A. O. Smith
- Also called: Briggs and Stratton Flyer, Red Bug, Auto Red Bug
- Production: 1916–1920

Body and chassis
- Class: Cyclecar

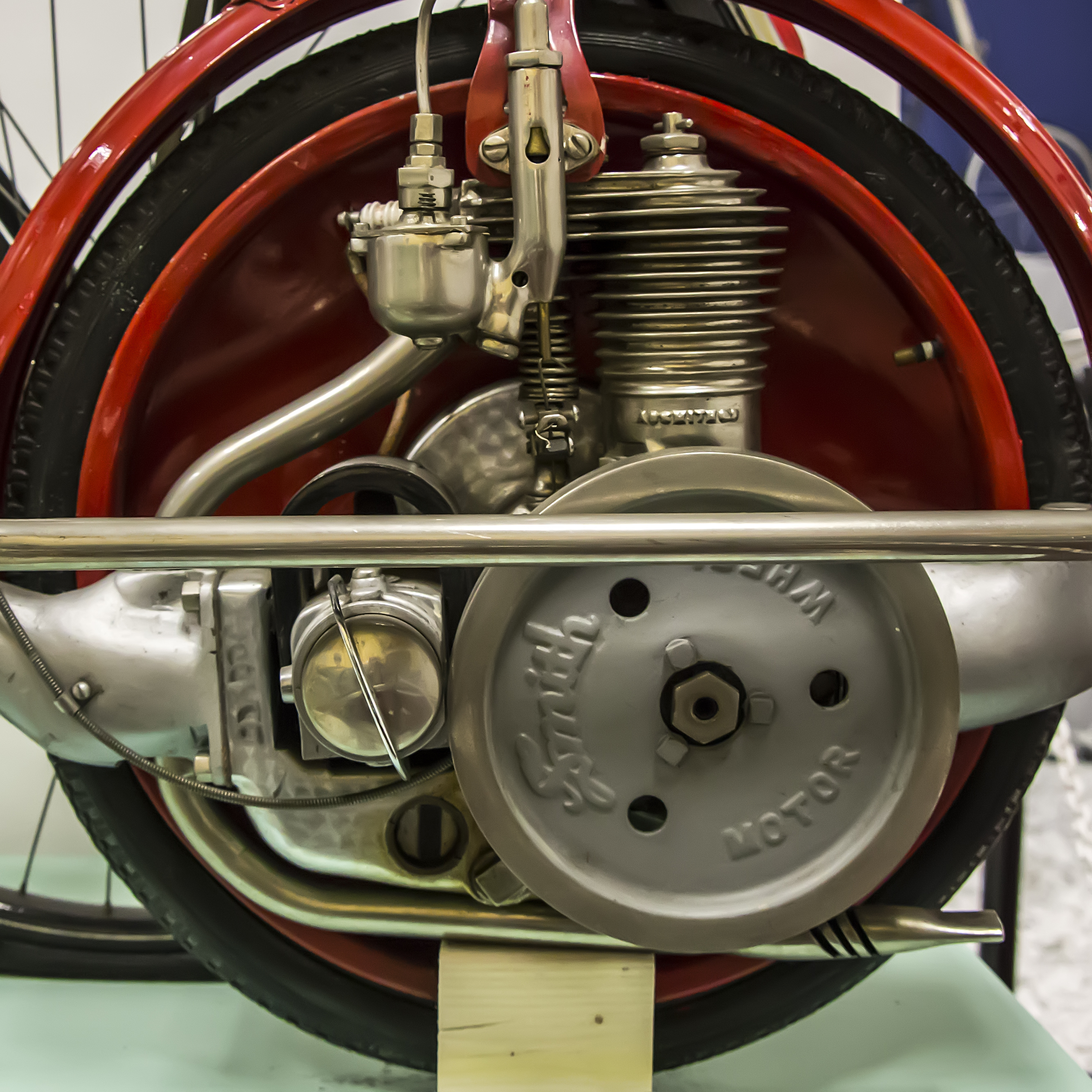
Smith Motor Wheel

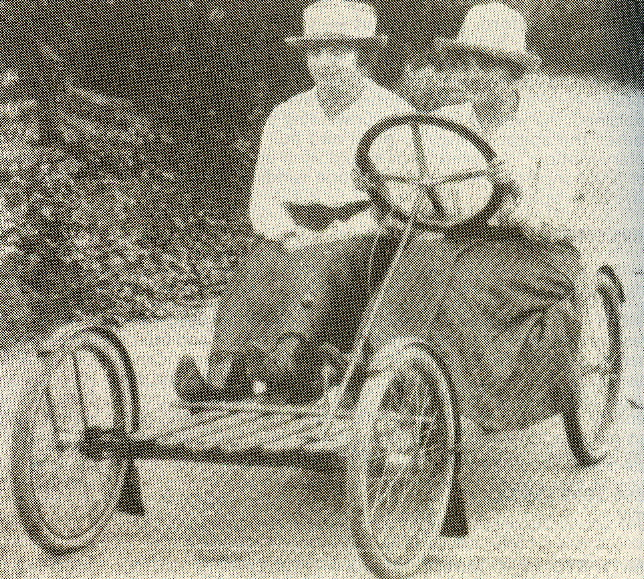
1917 Smith Flyer

The Smith Flyer was an American automobile manufactured by the A.O. Smith Company in Milwaukee from 1915 until about 1919 when the manufacturing rights were sold to Briggs & Stratton and it was renamed the Briggs & Stratton Flyer.

== History ==
The Smith Flyer is a small, simple, lightweight, two-seat vehicle with a wooden frame that doubles as the body and as the suspension. A small gasoline engine is mounted on a fifth wheel, or motor wheel, to drive the Flyer. The wheelbase was 62 inches (1575 mm), the wheels were 20 inches (508 mm) in diameter, and the width was 30 inches (762 mm). Since the 5th wheel was directly driven by the engine, the engine was started with the driving wheel lifted slightly in the air, and then when the engine was running smoothly, the driver lowered the engine (by means of a lever) gently to start the forward motion.

The direct drive motor wheel was developed by Arthur William Wall of Birmingham, England, around 1910 to power a bicycle. The concept of attaching the motor directly to the wheel was not new; Ferdinand Porsche developed one around 1900, but his motor wheel was electric. The A.O. Smith Corporation of Milwaukee, Wisconsin, acquired the U.S. manufacturing rights to the Wall motorwheel in 1914 and first produced the motor wheel for use on bicycles, but later added the wooden-framed buckboard car that they called the "Smith Motorwheel".

=== Briggs & Stratton Flyer ===
In 1919 the manufacturing rights were purchased by the Briggs & Stratton Company, who produced the Motor Wheel and Flyers. They made several improvements in the engine, increasing the bore size, along with a new, all steel connecting rod and flywheel magneto. These improvements increased the power output to 2 horsepower (1.5 kW). Briggs & Stratton marketed the Flyer nationwide, and even started a publication entitled Motor Wheel Age. In 1925, when they sold the rights to the Flyer to Automotive Electric Services Corporation. The Automotive Electric Services continued to produce the Flyer until the supply of engines ran out, then they substituted an electric motor driven by a battery.

Briggs & Stratton kept the motor that had been the heart of the Motor Wheel and adapted it to other applications such as lawn mowers and running small equipment. The Motor Wheel motor was the progenitor of all Briggs & Stratton motors to follow.

Virtually all Flyers were painted red and were known widely as the “Red Bug”. The Flyer is listed in the Guinness Book of Records as the most inexpensive car of all time. The book lists the 1922 Briggs & Stratton Flyer as selling from US$125 to US$150 (equivalent to $2400 to $2890 in 2025) .

A few Smith Flyers still exist in collections, and blueprints for the car are available online.

== See also ==
- Cyclecar

== Additional reading ==
- David Burgess Wise, The New Illustrated Encyclopedia of Automobiles
- Altman, Jim, “The Motor Wheel”, Antique Automobile, March–April 1971, pp. 9–24.
- McFarlan, Donald, Editor, The Guinness Book of Records, Bantam Books, 1992, page 361.
- Ken W. Purdy, Motorcars of the Golden Past, Galahad Books, NY, pages 98–99.
- Rodengen, Jeff, The Legend of Briggs & Stratton, Write Stuff Syndicate, 1995, pages 30–39.
