= Briggs & Stratton =

American manufacturing company

Briggs & Stratton Corporation
- Type: Private
- Industry: Manufacturing
- Founded: 1908; 118 years ago
- Founder: Stephen Foster Briggs; Harold M. Stratton
- Fate: Bankrupt and sale under section 363 to KPS Capital partners
- Headquarters: Wauwatosa, Wisconsin, U.S.
- Key people: Kristina Cerniglia (CEO)
- Products: Gasoline engines, Home Standby Generators, Lithium-Ion Batteries
- Revenue: ▼US$1.786 billion (2017)
- Operating income: ▲US$86 million (2017)
- Net income: ▲US$57 million (2017)
- Total assets: ▼US$1.451 billion (2017)
- Total equity: ▲US$559 million (2017)
- Owner: KPS Capital Partners
- Number of employees: 3,800 (2024)
- Website: briggsandstratton.com

Briggs & Stratton Corporation is an American manufacturer of small engines with headquarters in Wauwatosa, Wisconsin.

Engine production averages 10 million units per year as of April 2015. The company reports that it has thirteen large facilities in the U.S. and eight more in Australia, Brazil, Canada, China, Mexico, and the Netherlands. The company's products are sold in over 100 countries across the globe.

== History ==
In 1908, inventor Stephen Foster Briggs and investor Harold M. Stratton started an informal partnership to capitalize on the growing automobile industry. Eventually Briggs and Stratton settled on manufacturing automotive components and small gasoline engines.

In 1919, Briggs & Stratton purchased the manufacturing rights for a small, simple two-seat vehicle with a gasoline engine called the Smith Flyer from the A.O. Smith Company in Milwaukee. The Flyer had a small gasoline engine mounted on a fifth wheel, or motor wheel. Briggs & Stratton made engine improvements that raised the horsepower and renamed the vehicle the Briggs & Stratton Flyer. The Guinness Book of Records lists the Flyer as the most inexpensive car of all time, selling at US$125 to US$150 (equivalent to $2020 to $2430 in 2021). In 1925 they sold the rights to the Flyer to Automotive Electric Services Corporation. Briggs & Stratton kept the motor that had been the heart of the motor wheel and adapted it to power other applications such as bicycles, reel lawn mowers and small equipment such as washing machines.

The company went public on the New York Stock Exchange in 1928.

During World War II, Briggs & Stratton produced generators for the war effort. Some pre-war engines were made with aluminum, which helped the company develop its expertise in using this material. This development, along with the post-war growth of 1950s suburbs (and lawns), helped secure Briggs & Stratton's successful growth throughout the 1950s and 1960s.

Stephen Briggs went on to purchase Evinrude and Johnson Outboards and start the Outboard Marine Corporation. Frederick P. Stratton Sr. (the son of Harold Stratton) served as Chairman of Briggs & Stratton until his death in 1962 (Harold also died that year). Frederick P. Stratton Jr. served as Chairman until his retirement in 2001.

In 1995, Briggs & Stratton sold the automotive component business. The resulting company is Strattec Security Corporation.

In 2000, the company acquired its consumer generator business from the Beacon Group and formed Briggs & Stratton Power Products. The Beacon Group had previously purchased the Consumer Products Division of Generac Corporation (now Generac Power Systems) in 1998. Murray, Inc, one of its largest customers, collapsed in 2004 owing the company $40 million, and to minimize the loss Briggs & Stratton purchased the name, marketing rights and product designs of that company. In 2005, the company added Simplicity Manufacturing Inc, and Snapper, Inc, to the Briggs & Stratton Power Products line. In 2008, Briggs & Stratton announced it would be acquiring the Victa Lawn Care business from GUD Holdings Limited Australia for A$23 million.

In 2019, Briggs & Stratton announced they would be closing their engine factory in Murray, Kentucky, with production being moved to their Poplar Bluff, Missouri, facility.

On July 20, 2020, Briggs & Stratton filed for Chapter 11 bankruptcy. KPS Capital Partners purchased a majority of the company stake for $550 million. In September, KPS closed on the acquisition of Briggs & Stratton; this sale waives the $900 million that Briggs & Stratton owed going into bankruptcy.

== Acquisitions, agreements and joint ventures ==
- Farymann Diesel GmbH (1979–1984) – Based in Lampertheim (near Mannheim) in Germany, this was the first foreign acquisition Briggs & Stratton had ever made and was a poor fit with the company's acknowledged expertise in high volume, low cost production. They officially completed the acquisition on May 29, 1979. Despite investing in new production methods, Briggs & Stratton never understood the very low volume, highly customized nature of the air-cooled diesel engine market. After considering adding Italy's Lombardini to increase its presence in the diesel market, as well as a failed attempt to develop its own designs, Briggs & Stratton accepted defeat and sold the company to a private investor for a minimal amount to avoid further liabilities. Since the energy crisis had not affected the US market's preference for gasoline engines, enthusiasm waned rapidly at management level for diesel engines.
- Daihatsu Briggs & Stratton (DBS) – In an effort to stave off Japanese competition during the 1980s, Briggs & Stratton entered a 50/50 joint venture with the Toyota subsidiary Daihatsu Motor Company in Japan. Located in Shiga Prefecture (50 miles (80 km) from Osaka, Japan), construction on the then-57,000-square-foot (5,300 m^{2}) plant began in December 1986 and was completed in April 1987. This joint venture was notable for the manufacture of vertical and horizontal crankshaft engines from 12.5 to 22 hp (16 kW) under the Vanguard brand. Today the plant employs roughly 100 people on two shifts and manufactures Vanguard V-twin engines ranging from 14 to 36 hp (27 kW). By the end of 2017, Briggs & Stratton is planning to move the production of Vanguard V-twin from Japan to USA
- The Mitsubishi Agreement – The Vanguard line initially consisted of three single-cylinder engines and several V-twin engines. The V-twins, made by DBS, had sold very well but the single-cylinder engine models, originally produced at Briggs & Stratton's Menomonee Falls, Wisconsin plant, didn't fare so well. Briggs & Stratton needed to solve this problem, so, following discussions with several Japanese engine manufacturers, it entered into an agreement with Mitsubishi Heavy Industries Ltd. of Tokyo, Japan. Briggs & Stratton produced only certain parts for the engines, while Mitsubishi was responsible for overall production and shipping. The completed single-cylinder engines were shipped from Japan directly to customers worldwide. Briggs & Stratton had exclusive marketing rights for the resulting products only in North America, Europe and Australia/New Zealand. MHI had exclusive marketing rights (under their own brand name) in Malaysia, Taiwan, South Korea and Japan. In other countries both companies competed with the same product under their own brand names which led to considerable friction, and together with escalating production costs in Japan, caused this otherwise successful relationship to fail. Briggs & Stratton commenced marketing alternative U.S.-made single-cylinder engines under the Vanguard brand in early 2007.
- The Komatsu Zenoah Venture – In May 1987, Briggs & Stratton entered into an agreement with yet another Japanese company, executing a 10-year contract with the Komatsu Zenoah Company of Tachikawa, Japan. Under the terms of the contract, Komatsu would manufacture a 2-cycle, 4 hp (3 kW) engine, which Briggs & Stratton would purchase and distribute in the United States, Europe, Australia and New Zealand. Said Fred Stratton, "This venture was not successful, because the rising price of the yen made the engine too expensive in the U.S."
- The Toro Agreement – In 1999, Briggs & Stratton made a license agreement with The Toro Company of Bloomington, Minnesota. to produce the Toro R*Tek piston ported version of their E series 2-stroke engine (AKA Lawn-Boy DuraForce) for use in Toro Snow Throwers. The engine was a 141cc 2-cycle that produced from 4 hp to 6.5 hp at 3700 to 4000 rpm on a 50:1 gas & oil mix. A higher power 7-HP model was made (Engine Model# 84330) for use in heavier duty machines such as the single stage Snow Commander (2001–2008) and 2 stage Power Max 726TE/6000 (2004–2008); the extra horsepower was obtained using transfer ports in the piston and cylinder wall, and this model ran at the same operating speed as the 6.5 hp engines (4000rpm). Production stopped in 2011.

== Innovations ==
- The aluminum engine – This was introduced in 1953 as a means of having a lighter-weight engine for applications such as rotary lawn mowers. It was improved five years later in 1958 with the introduction of the Kool-Bore (all aluminum) and Sleeve-Bore (aluminum, with a cast iron cylinder liner).
- Easy-Spin Starting – This compression release, implemented as an extra hump on the intake lobe of the camshaft, was introduced in 1961 to reduce the effort required to start an engine. In 1982, a new U.S. federal safety regulation required lawnmower blades to stop spinning within three seconds of the operator letting go of the handle. The least costly, most common way of complying with the new regulation was to put a flywheel brake on the mower engine, to stop the engine (and therefore the blade) immediately when the handle was released. Briggs & Stratton engineers found engines with the Easy-Spin camshaft were unacceptably difficult to restart after being braked to a quick stop. The Easy-Spin lobe hump was moved to the exhaust valve, but this reduced engine performance. The intake-side Easy-Spin remained in use on Briggs & Stratton's engines larger than those used on mowers subject to the brake requirement, but was discontinued in 1997 due to tightening emission regulations.
- The Synchro-Balanced Engine – This 1966 innovation was designed to attenuate vibration caused by the reciprocating mass of a single-cylinder engine. The design was a series of counterweights opposing the crankpin.
- The Twin Cylinder Engine – This engine was introduced in 1977 as a means of competing with Briggs & Stratton's rivals, particularly Japanese firms like Honda who were cutting into traditional Briggs & Stratton markets by producing lawn mower engines (and later, complete lawn mowers). These first models were rated 16 hp (11.9 kW) and displaced 40 cubic inches (656 cc), but were joined in 1979 by 42 cubic inch (694 cc) models rated at 18 hp (13.4 kW). The original price for the 16 hp (12 kW) version was $70 lower (at US$228) than their single-cylinder cast-iron version bearing the same power rating.
- Industrial/Commercial (I/C) – This series of engines, initially ranging from 3 to 20.5 hp (15.3 kW), was introduced in 1979 as Briggs & Stratton's answer to high quality commercial-duty engines produced by competitors. These engines include heavy-duty features such as Stellite exhaust valves, upgraded bearings, cast iron sleeved cylinder bores and high-capacity air cleaners.
- The Briggs & Stratton Gasoline/Electric Hybrid Car – In 1979, at the tail end of the energy crisis, Briggs & Stratton developed the first gasoline-electric hybrid automobile concept car. "The Hybrid" was designed by Brooks Stevens, had six wheels and was powered by a twin-cylinder 16 hp (11.9 kW) Briggs & Stratton engine and a large bank of 6v lead-acid electric batteries. Only the second axle was driven, with an extra rear axle added to support the weight of the batteries.
- Magnetron Ignition – This solid-state ignition system introduced by Briggs & Stratton in 1982 eliminated the points-and-condenser system, the performance of which steadily degraded between required periodic maintenance service. Magnetron was made available for retrofitment to Briggs & Stratton engines made since 1963. Competitor Tecumseh had made a capacitor discharge ignition setup since 1968 for their cast iron engine models, expanding its availability and making it standard equipment on vertical shaft engines powering lawn mowers in late 1976, five years before the advent of the Briggs Magnetron. Defunct competitor Clinton Engines commercialized a piezo "Spark Pump" ignition without breaker points in the early 1960s.

== Logo history ==
The Briggs & Stratton logo was always a masthead, but it has been changed several times over the course of the company's 80-plus years.

- Pre War logos (1931–1943) – This logo started off with a diamond shape and read Briggs & Stratton and its home city of MILWAUKEE, WIS., U.S.A. below it; in the middle, it had the words 4 CYCLE on the top mast and the words GASOLINE MOTOR and phrase MADE IN U.S.A. on the bottom mast. About 1934 Briggs & Stratton added the more familiar shape of a diamond split across the center with a banner.
- Gold Logo (1948–1963) – This logo had the name BRIGGS STRATTON and its home city of MILWAUKEE, WIS., U.S.A. below it; in the middle, it had the words 4 CYCLE on the top mast and the words GASOLINE ENGINE and phrase MADE IN U.S.A. on the bottom mast.
- Gold Logo (II) (1963–1976) – Although similar to the last logo, this had differently arranged wording: The name BRIGGS STRATTON was written in a new logotype, however, this design also included the horsepower rating above the gold logo in the white field, its city of location was in the middle as before, only this time the patent numbers were eliminated (if you look at a decal on a production engine) from the bottom portion of the mast. There were some engines produced until 1977 that used the prior logo from 1948.
- Red, White and Blue Logo (1976-1983) – This logo was introduced to replace the gold color and was phased out over a period in the mid eighties, which included engine cartons and replacement parts packaging.
- The Red, White, and Black Logo (1983–present) – This is the company's current logo. The logo has the name BRIGGS STRATTON in black letters on the white midsection of the masthead. The words 4 CYCLE ENGINE are on the red top portion of the mast and the city line MILWAUKEE, WISCONSIN, U.S.A. is written on the black bottom portion of the mast. Although the logo hasn't been changed much since then, the wording on the top and bottom sections of the mast were removed in 1985, although the company continued to use these two sections with the respective wordings ORIGINAL (red section) and SERVICE PARTS (black section) until 1989.

== Models ==
Flathead with gravity-feed float carb unless otherwise noted

=== Cast-iron models ===
Number series

- 5 (1950–1957)
- 5S (1949–1957); suction carburetor
- 6 (1952–1957)
- 6H (1950-1955)
- 6S (1949–1957); suction carburetor
- 8 (1949–1957)
- 9 (1948–1962)
- 14 (1948–1963)
- 19 (1957–1965)
- 19D (1963–1965)
- 23 (1949–1957)
- 23A (1956–1965)
- 23C (1961–1963)
- 23D (1963–1965)
- 191400 and 193400 (1965–1966)
- 200400 (1966–1974)
- 231400 (1965–1966)
- 233400 (1965–1991)
- 243400 (1965–1991)
- 300420 (1966–1971)
- 301430 (1971–1972)
- 302430 (1972–1977)
- 320420 (1969–1971)
- 325430 (1971–1972)
- 326430 (1972–1991)

Letter series

- A (1933–1948)
- B (1934-1948)
- F "Full Power" (1921-1922); suction carb, overhead valve
- FB "Full Power" (1922-1925); suction carb, overhead valve
- FC "Full Power" (1924-1925); suction carb, overhead valve
- FE (1925); suction carb, overhead valve
- FG (1927); overhead valve
- FH (1925–1933); suction carb, overhead valve
- FHI (1929); float carb, overhead valve
- FI (1927–1933); overhead valve
- FJ-1 (1929-1937); aluminum parts, used exclusively on military generators
- FJ-2 (1930–1932); cast iron civilian version of FJ-1
- H (1933–1940)
- I & IS (1940–1949)
- IB & INT (1938-1942)
- K (1933-1940)
- L & LA (1930–1932); suction carb, used on washing machines
- M & MJ (1930–1934)
- N, NS & NP (1940–1954)
- P (1920); F-head
- PB (1923–1935); F-head
- PC-WI-100 (1941-1943); power charger with WI engine
- PC-200 (1936-1938); power charger with Y engine; used as a generator set
- PC-300 (1938-1944); power charger with I engine; used as a generator for the M33 multiple gun mount
- PC-304 (1943); power charger with I engine; used as a generator for the M45 multiple gun mount
- PC-WM (1936-1938); power charger with WM engine; used as a generator set
- PC-WMB (1938-1940); power charger with WMB engine
- Q (1925–1933); first flathead model
- R, RA, R2 & RC (1929–1933)
- R1 & RH (1929-1932)
- S (1920?)
- S (1930–1933); suction carb
- T (1930–1931)
- U (1940–1945); suction carb
- W & WA (1931–1933)
- WI, WR & WMB (1938–1957); suction carb
- WM & WMI ('Washing Machine', 1936–1941); cast iron, suction carb; WMI was an industrial version
- WMG (1937–1941); cast iron, suction carb; WM with generator
- Y (1931–1940); cast iron, suction carb
- Z and ZZ (1931–1949)

Many variations and submodels were available on the basic series mentioned above. Some variations include:

- gear reduction (gears bolted to the back of the engine to slow the speed of the PTO shaft) first offered in 1934, on models A B K and Z later on I U N and WI. Designated by an "R" after the basic model, then a 2, 4, or 6 to designate the reduction ratio.
- high speed models (higher intake capacity to run higher rpm) available on the A B K M R and Z series. designated with an "H" after the basic model.
- lightweight models (some aluminum parts to save weight) available on the A B I K R and Z series. Designated with an "L" after the basic model
- inboard marine engines (special base, no governor, thrust bearing on PTO side) available on models A B H I K N and Z. Designated with an "M" after the basic model. Some models also had forward neutral and reverse transmissions. These engines have an "T" or "G" after the "M"

=== Aluminum models ===
- 6B (horizontal shaft) (1955–1959)
- 6BH (vertical shaft) (1953–1958)
- 6BHS (vertical shaft; suction carburetor) (1953–1958)
- 6BS (horizontal shaft; suction carburetor) (1955–1958)
- 8B (horizontal shaft) (1955–1958)
- 8BH (vertical shaft) (1953–1958)
- 60100 (horizontal shaft) (1958–1991)
- 80100 (horizontal shaft) (1958–1977)
- 80200 (horizontal shaft) (1960–1991) (horizontal shaft) and 190700 (vertical shaft) (1969–1997)
- 90000
- 97000 Europa OHV (vertical shaft)
- 100000
- 110000
- 120000
- 130000
- 140000 (horizontal shaft) (1958–1966)
- 170000
- 252410 (horizontal shaft) and 252700 (vertical shaft) (1977–1991)
- 280000
- 310000 OHV
- 400000 Twin Cylinder
- 420000 Twin Cylinder
- 460000 Twin Cylinder

=== Industrial and commercial models ===
- 81300 and 81400 (horizontal shaft) (1979–1985)
- 82200 (horizontal shaft; Quiet Power) (1982–1994)
- 82300 and 82400 (horizontal shaft; Quiet Power) (1982–1994)
- 114900 (vertical shaft; Quiet Power) (1982–1991)
- 131200 (horizontal shaft) (1979–1985)
- 132200 (horizontal shaft; Quiet Power) (1982–1994)
- 131900 (vertical shaft) (1979–1989)
- 132900 (vertical shaft; Quiet Power) (1982–1995)
- 192700 and 193700 (vertical shaft) (1983–1994)
- 195400 (horizontal shaft) (1979–1994)
- 221400 (horizontal shaft) (1979–1985)
- 255400 (vertical shaft) (1984–1994)
- 281000 (vertical shaft) (1981–1991)
- Briggs & Stratton/I/C 283H07-0399-E1 (050923AZ) (16-hp) (vertical shaft)

=== Outboard motors ===
Briggs & Stratton/I/tC 130g32-0059-h1

=== Karting engines ===
- World Formula 16 HP OHV
- Animal 6.5 HP OHV
- Raptor 5 HP flathead

=== Two-cycle engines ===
- 084300 (Horizontal shaft) (1999–2011) Made under license for Toro as the R*TEK 141cc E Series Snow Thrower
- 062030 (Horizontal shaft) (1980–1993)
- 095700 and 096700 (Vertical shaft) (1988-1991) Made under a contract with Komatsu Zenoah

== See also ==
- Eshelman
- John I. Beggs – former Chairman

== Headquarters, manufacturing plants, and testing facilities ==
Briggs & Stratton builds over 9,000,000 engines in the USA each year. The company employs over 3,000 employees in six states. Wauwatosa, WI, is home to the company's headquarters and R&D center. Manufacturing plants are located in Poplar Bluff, MO; Auburn, AL; Statesboro, GA; and Sherrill, NY. The company also has a proving grounds and testing facility located in Fort Pierce, FL.
