= National Register of Historic Places listings in Codington County, South Dakota =

Location of Codington County in South Dakota

This is a list of the National Register of Historic Places listings in Codington County, South Dakota.

This is intended to be a complete list of the properties and districts on the National Register of Historic Places in Codington County, South Dakota, United States. The locations of National Register properties and districts for which the latitude and longitude coordinates are included below, may be seen in a map.

There are 43 properties and districts listed on the National Register in the county. One property that was once listed on the Register has been removed.

This National Park Service list is complete through NPS recent listings posted May 1, 2026.

== Current listings ==
	Name on the Register	Image	Date listed	Location	City or town	Description
1	E.C. Adams House		January 3, 1989 (#88003032)	604 N. Maple; 44°54′30″N 97°06′39″W	Watertown	
2	Barr Farmstead		August 4, 2005 (#05000831)	15539 444th Ave. 45°08′00″N 97°19′55″W	Florence	
3	Beskow Barn		October 24, 2003 (#03001072)	15689 456th Ave. 45°06′33″N 97°05′13″W	South Shore	
4	Carnegie Free Public Library	Carnegie Free Public Library	June 18, 1976 (#76001724)	27 1st Ave., SE. 44°53′57″N 97°06′47″W	Watertown	
5	Benjamin H. Cartford House		January 3, 1989 (#88003025)	803 N. Maple; 44°54′37″N 97°06′40″W	Watertown	
6	Citizens State Bank of Henry	Citizens State Bank of Henry	November 7, 1997 (#97001391)	Junction of Main and 2nd Sts. 44°52′41″N 97°28′06″W	Henry	
7	Codington County Courthouse	Codington County Courthouse	July 24, 1978 (#78002545)	1st Ave., SE. 44°53′55″N 97°06′51″W	Watertown	
8	Amy A. Davis House	Amy A. Davis House	January 3, 1989 (#88003030)	20 4th Ave., NW. 44°54′21″N 97°06′55″W	Watertown	
9	Curt E. DeGraff House	Curt E. DeGraff House	January 3, 1989 (#88003033)	603 N. Park; 44°54′30″N 97°06′52″W	Watertown	
10	Corson Emminger Round Barn	Corson Emminger Round Barn	March 30, 1978 (#78002546)	South of Watertown on U.S. Route 81; 44°51′41″N 97°06′34″W	Watertown	Tall round barn built by farmer Corson Emminger during 1909-10, made of concrete blocks with a two-tier roof and a cupola
11	Evangelical United Brethren Church	Evangelical United Brethren Church	January 3, 1989 (#88003026)	409 N. Maple; 44°54′22″N 97°06′41″W	Watertown	
12	James W. Ferris House	James W. Ferris House	January 3, 1989 (#88003034)	619 N. Park; 44°54′31″N 97°06′52″W	Watertown	
13	Florence Methodist Church		June 28, 1991 (#91000848)	Junction of 5th St. and Dolly Ave. 45°03′20″N 97°19′46″W	Florence	
14	C.E. and Bertha Fowler House	C.E. and Bertha Fowler House	February 9, 2001 (#01000096)	316 1st Ave., SE. 44°53′53″N 97°06′34″W	Watertown	
15	Dr. H.M. Freeburg House	Dr. H.M. Freeburg House	January 3, 1989 (#88003035)	501 N. Park; 44°54′26″N 97°06′52″W	Watertown	
16	A.C. Gilruth House	A.C. Gilruth House	January 3, 1989 (#88003031)	218 2nd Ave., NE. 44°54′14″N 97°06′31″W	Watertown	
17	Goodhue Lutheran Church	Goodhue Lutheran Church	July 17, 1996 (#96000745)	15555 441st Ave. 45°07′47″N 97°23′33″W	Florence	
18	Nels M. Hanson Farmstead		July 13, 1989 (#89000831)	4 miles (6.4 km) north of Henry; 44°57′20″N 97°27′06″W	Henry	
19	John B. Hanten House	John B. Hanten House	January 26, 1990 (#89002337)	518 E. Kemp Ave. 44°53′54″N 97°06′19″W	Watertown	
20	Dr. Harry Henningson House	Dr. Harry Henningson House	January 3, 1989 (#88003036)	802 1st St., NW. 44°54′37″N 97°06′55″W	Watertown	
21	Holy Rosary Church		June 6, 1986 (#86001227)	Minnesota Ave. 44°53′35″N 96°55′01″W	Kranzburg	
22	A. Einar Johnson House	A. Einar Johnson House	January 3, 1989 (#88003029)	803 1st St., NW. 44°54′37″N 97°06′57″W	Watertown	
23	Mabel and David Jones House		November 8, 2001 (#01001221)	425 N. Park; 44°54′23″N 97°06′51″W	Watertown	
24	Kemp Avenue Bridge	Kemp Avenue Bridge	December 9, 1993 (#93001264)	Kemp Ave. over the Big Sioux River; 44°54′10″N 97°07′33″W	Watertown	
25	Kranzburg School District No. 5		June 28, 1991 (#91000847)	Hasting St. 44°53′33″N 96°55′07″W	Kranzburg	
26	Mathiesen House	Mathiesen House	February 1, 1982 (#82003923)	914 N. Maple; 44°54′42″N 97°06′38″W	Watertown	
27	Peter Mauseth House		January 3, 1989 (#88003028)	703 N. Maple; 44°54′32″N 97°06′41″W	Watertown	
28	Andrew and Lulu Melham House		July 28, 2011 (#11000485)	721 1st. St., NW; 44°54′33″N 97°06′56″W	Watertown	North End Neighborhood MPS
29	Mellette House	Mellette House	August 13, 1976 (#76001725)	421 5th Ave., NW. 44°54′26″N 97°07′16″W	Watertown	
30	Minneapolis and St. Louis Railroad Depot	Minneapolis and St. Louis Railroad Depot	October 31, 1985 (#85003477)	168 N. Broadway; 44°54′12″N 97°06′43″W	Watertown	
31	Mount Hope Cemetery Mausoleum	Mount Hope Cemetery Mausoleum	August 13, 1986 (#86001500)	Mt. Hope Cemetery off U.S. Route 81; 44°54′59″N 97°05′56″W	Watertown	
32	Olive Place		May 23, 1978 (#78002547)	223 14th Ave NW; 44°55′12″N 97°07′06″W	Watertown	Moved in 2018.
33	Puhlman Farm		October 24, 2003 (#03001075)	44350 176th St. 44°50′08″N 97°20′28″W	Hazel	
34	Reeve's Resort		October 19, 1989 (#89001726)	6 miles (9.7 km) south of Florence; 44°58′41″N 97°21′18″W	Florence	
35	Nicholas T. Ries Farmstead		February 11, 1988 (#88000047)	Off Codington County Highway 3; 44°51′43″N 96°55′35″W	Kranzburg	
36	Gen. Mark W. Sheafe House	Gen. Mark W. Sheafe House	February 26, 1987 (#87000222)	57 4th Ave., NW. 44°54′24″N 97°06′51″W	Watertown	
37	South Dakota Dept. of Transportation Bridge No. 15-210-136		December 9, 1993 (#93001265)	Local road over an unnamed creek 44°57′11″N 97°03′55″W	Watertown	
38	Dr. Tarbell House	Dr. Tarbell House	June 6, 2001 (#01000634)	304 2nd Ave., SE. 44°53′49″N 97°06′36″W	Watertown	
39	Watertown Commercial Historic District	Watertown Commercial Historic District	July 13, 1989 (#89000834)	Roughly bounded by 1st Ave., N., 3rd St., E., 2nd Ave., S., and 1st St., W.; also roughly bounded by 1st St. West, 3rd St. East, 1st Ave. North, 2nd Ave. South; 44°54′00″N 97°06′49″W	Watertown	Second set of addresses represent a boundary decrease approved January 29, 2021.
40	Watertown Post Office	Watertown Post Office	December 12, 1976 (#76001726)	26 S. Broadway; 44°53′58″N 97°06′51″W	Watertown	
41	Watertown Stadium	Watertown Stadium	July 5, 2000 (#00000721)	1600 W. Kemp Ave. 44°54′07″N 97°08′22″W	Watertown	
42	Walter Willson House	Walter Willson House	January 3, 1989 (#88003027)	702 2nd St., NE. 44°54′33″N 97°06′33″W	Watertown	
43	Zech Farmstead		March 31, 2005 (#04001360)	16676 456th Ave. 44°58′04″N 97°05′05″W	Watertown	

== Former listings ==
	Name on the Register	Image	Date listed	Date removed	Location	City or town	Description
1	Appleby Atlas Elevator		June 21, 1990 (#90000957)	August 1, 2012	6 miles (9.7 km) south of the junction of Interstate 29 and U.S. Route 212; 44°48′56″N 97°02′59″W	Watertown	Torn down
2	Halse Halfway House		June 5, 1975 (#75001715)	June 9, 1987	6 mi. N of Florence	Florence vicinity	
2	Larson Bridge		December 9, 1993 (#93001266)	December 15, 1999	Local rd. over Willow Cr.	Watertown vicinity	
3	Watertown Light and Power Company Plant		July 30, 1989 (#89000830)	May 1, 2001	524 W. Kemp Street	Watertown	

== See also ==
- List of National Historic Landmarks in South Dakota
- National Register of Historic Places listings in South Dakota
