= Joseph Schwartz (architect) =

American architect

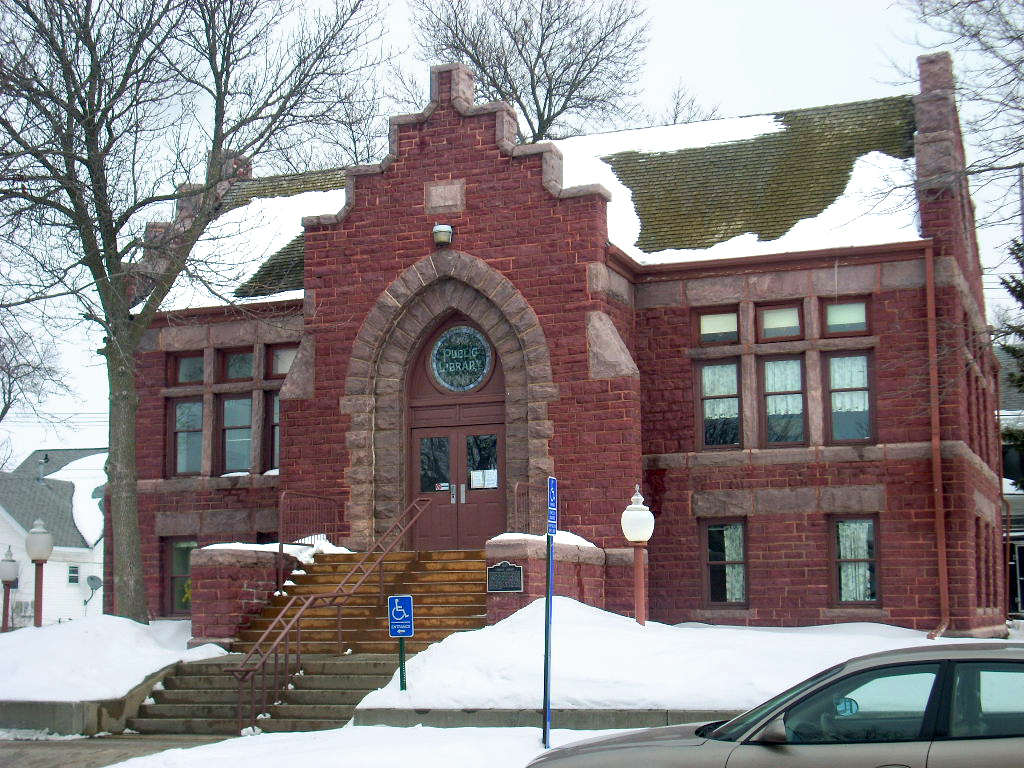
Pipestone Public Library

Joseph Schwartz (1858-December 26, 1927), known also as Josef Schwartz, was a notable architect of Sioux Falls, South Dakota.

He also seems to have been known as Joseph Schwarz or Joseph Schwarz, Sr..

A number of his works are listed on the U.S. National Register of Historic Places.

Works include (with attribution):

Joseph Schwartz

- Carnegie Free Public Library, built 1903, 235 W. 10th St., Sioux Falls, SD (Schwartz, Joseph), NRHP-listed
- First Methodist Church, 302 S. Carroll St., Rock Rapids, IA (Schwartz, Joseph), NRHP-listed
- Holy Rosary Church, Minnesota Ave., Kranzburg, SD (Schwartz, Joseph), NRHP-listed
- Immaculate Conception Catholic Church and Rectory, 102 and 108 E 9th St., St. Helena, NE (Schwartz, Josef), NRHP-listed
- Lyon County Courthouse, 3rd and Story Sts., Rock Rapids, IA (Schwartz, Joseph), NRHP-listed
- Pipestone Public Library, 3rd St., SE and S. Hiawatha Ave., Pipestone, MN (Schwartz, Joseph), NRHP-listed
- Saints Peter and Paul Catholic Church Complex, 106 W. 889th Rd., Bow Valley, NE (Schwartz, Josef), NRHP-listed
- St. Mary's Church, School and Convent, U.S. 212, Zell, SD (Schwartz, Joseph), NRHP-listed
- Washington High School, 315 S. Main, Sioux Falls, SD (Schwartz, Joseph), NRHP-listed

Joseph Schwarz

- One or more works in Augustana College Historic Buildings, 29th and S. Summit Sts., Sioux Falls, SD (Schwarz, Joseph), NRHP-listed
- Carpenter Hotel, 221 S. Phillips Ave., Sioux Falls, SD (Schwarz, Joseph), NRHP-listed
- Central Fire Station, 100 S. Minnesota Ave., Sioux Falls, SD (Schwarz, Joseph), NRHP-listed
- First Congregational Church, 303 S. Dakota Ave., Sioux Falls, SD (Schwarz, Joseph), NRHP-listed
- Jorden Hall, 1101 W. 22nd St., Sioux Falls, SD (Schwarz, Joseph), NRHP-listed
- Madison Masonic Temple, 229 N. Egan Ave., Madison, SD (Schwarz, Joseph, Sr.), NRHP-listed
- Moody County Courthouse, Pipestone Ave. between Crescent and Wind Sts., Flandreau, SD (Schwarz, Joseph), NRHP-listed
- Vermillion-Andrew Carnegie Library, 12 Church St., Vermillion, SD (Schwarz, Joseph), NRHP-listed
