= Goodhue Lutheran Church =

Historic church in South Dakota, United States

- U.S. National Register of Historic Places
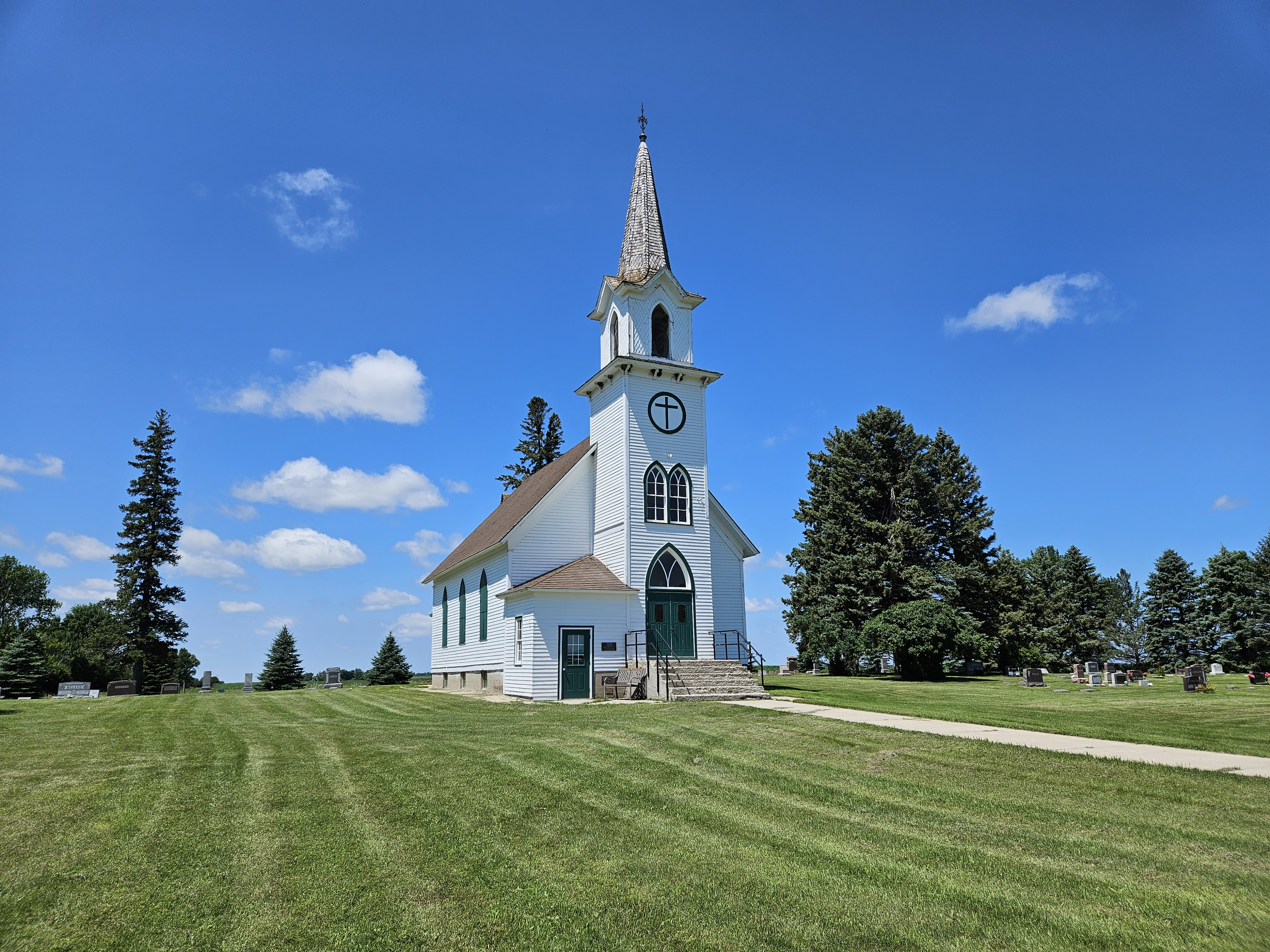

- Location within South Dakota Location within the United States
- Nearest city: Florence, South Dakota
- Coordinates: 45°7′47″N 97°23′33″W
- Area: 2 acres (0.81 ha)
- Built: 1904
- Architectural style: Gothic Revival
- NRHP reference No.: 96000745
- Added to NRHP: July 17, 1996

Goodhue Lutheran Church is a historic church located at Florence in rural Codington County, South Dakota. The congregation was organized in 1888. The Gothic Revival church was built in 1904. It was added to the National Register in 1996. This is an active church which is affiliated with the Evangelical Lutheran Church in America.
