= JH =

JH may refer to:

== Science and technology ==
- JH (hash function), in cryptography
- Juvenile hormone, in insects

== Transport ==
- Japan Highway Public Corporation
- Fuji Dream Airlines (since 2008, IATA code JH), a Japanese airline
- Harlequin Air (1997-2005, IATA code JH), a former Japanese airline
- Nordeste Linhas Aéreas Regionais (1976-1995, IATA code JH), a former Brazilian airline
- , symbol for Yokohama Line railway service

== Other uses ==
- Jh (digraph), in written language
- Jharkhand, India (ISO 3166: JH)
- Jim Henson (1936-1990), American puppeteer best known for creating the Muppets
- Jorden Hall, a building on the campus of the University of Sioux Falls, South Dakota
