= Grover, South Dakota =

Unincorporated community in South Dakota, U.S.

Coordinates: 44°48′50″N 97°16′07″W

Grover is an unincorporated community in Codington County, in the U.S. state of South Dakota.

== History ==
Grover had its start in 1888 when the Great Northern Railway was extended to that point. A post office was established at Grover in 1888, and remained in operation until 1958.
