= Florence Methodist Church =

Historic church in South Dakota, United States

- U.S. National Register of Historic Places
- Location within South Dakota Location within the United States
- Location: Jct. of 5th St. and Dolly Ave., Florence, South Dakota
- Coordinates: 45°3′20″N 97°19′46″W
- Area: less than one acre
- Built: 1908
- Built by: Painter & Sumner
- Architectural style: Akron plan church
- NRHP reference No.: 91000848
- Added to NRHP: June 28, 1991

The Florence Methodist Church is a historic church in Florence, South Dakota. It was built in 1908 and was added to the National Register in 1991.

It is vernacular in style but based on the Akron Plan.
