= Codington County Heritage Museum =

- Carnegie Free Public Library building
- U.S. National Register of Historic Places
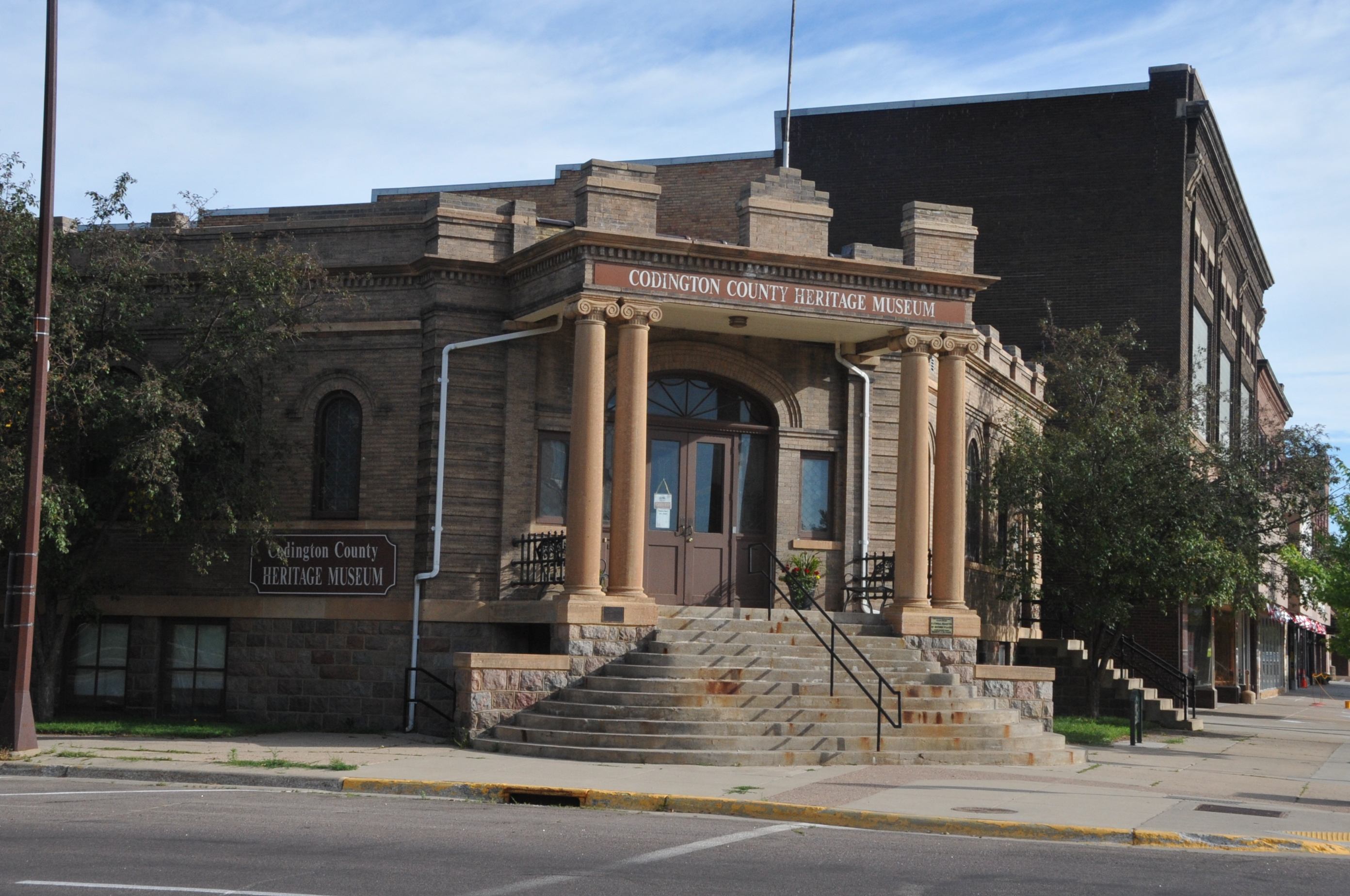

- Location within South Dakota Location within the United States
- Nearest city: Watertown, South Dakota
- Coordinates: 44°53′57″N 97°06′49″W
- Built: 1906
- Architect: L.E. Brickell
- Architectural style: Classical revival
- NRHP reference No.: 76001724
- Added to NRHP: 18 June 1976

The Codington County Heritage Museum (formerly the Kampeska Heritage Museum) is a museum located at 27 First Avenue Southeast, Watertown, South Dakota, in the Carnegie Free Public Library building.

The Carnegie Library was built in Watertown in 1906 through a grant from the Carnegie Foundation and functioned as a library until 1967 when operations moved to a new building further east in town next to what was then the newly built Watertown Senior High School. A youth group briefly occupied the Carnegie Library building before its use by the Codington County Historical Society.

== Codington County Historical Society ==
The museum is maintained by the Codington County Historical Society. The group was founded in 1970 and was officially incorporated in 1974. They put out a bi-monthly publication for paid members entitled the Codington County Courier. In the past, the publication was called Wagon Wheels.

== See also ==
- National Register of Historic Places listings in Codington County, South Dakota
