= Carpenter Building (Sioux Falls, South Dakota) =

- Carpenter Hotel
- U.S. National Register of Historic Places
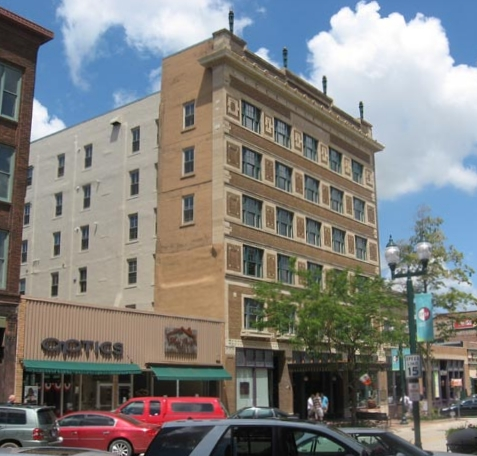
- Carpenter Hotel in 2009

- Location within South Dakota Location within the United States
- Location: 221 South Phillips Avenue, Sioux Falls, South Dakota
- Coordinates: 43°32′43″N 96°43′36″W
- Area: less than one acre
- Built: 1912
- Architect: Joseph Schwartz
- Architectural style: Early Commercial, Moderne
- NRHP reference No.: 86001499
- Added to NRHP: August 13, 1986

The Carpenter Building, historically the Carpenter Hotel or Hotel Carpenter and known colloquially as The Carpenter, is a historic building at 221 South Phillips Avenue in downtown Sioux Falls, South Dakota. Originally serving as a hotel from 1912 to 1966, it is now used for retail and apartment space. It was listed on the National Register of Historic Places in 1986.

== History ==
As one of the earliest hotels in Sioux Falls, the Carpenter Hotel contributed significantly to the city's early commercial growth. The nearby wooden Cataract Hotel was by this time notorious for having burned down twice by 1912, and new accommodations were needed. Frances G. Carpenter decided to build a new hotel out of sturdier material; indeed, early advertisements stressed that it was fireproof. Joseph Schwartz, who designed several other buildings in Sioux Falls and the surrounding area, was hired to design the hotel. The total cost of construction was $250,000. After its opening on October 15, 1912, the hotel became very successful, accommodating prominent visitors and hosting frequent events in its ground-floor dining room and ballroom. Notable guests during this period included Katharine Hepburn, Jimmy Dorsey, Bob Hope, and Benny Goodman. The Sioux Falls KSOO radio station had its first office in the hotel from 1926 to 1937. Local architect Harold Spitznagel was hired to remodel the hotel in 1940. Sheraton Hotels and Resorts acquired the hotel in 1956 and carried out major renovations.

However, in 1966, Sheraton sold the building to Nettleton College, a local business school, for use as a dormitory; during this period, it was named Nettleton Manor. In 1983, it was sold to a private owner and was converted into retail and office spaces. The building was listed on the National Register of Historic Places on August 13, 1986, due to its history as a commercial center and its early 20th century architectural integrity. Today, the building hosts several retail shops and the upper floors have been converted into apartments. The ballroom is used for special occasions.

== Architecture ==
The six-story Carpenter Building is a simple rectangular building in the Early Commercial style, later remodeled into a Moderne influence. It is built out of brown bricks and concrete and sits on a stone foundation. The cornice, which sits just below the sandstone parapet, is made out of pressed tin molded into scrolls. Decorative brickwork and sandstone inclusions span the building's front façade. Sandstone belts, some set with box decorations, surround the windows and divide the first three floors. A smaller, three-story addition sits on the north side of the main building and is styled in a similar fashion. Much of the interior is the result of Harold Spitznagel's extensive remodel in 1940 and involves elements of early Moderne architecture. The main lobby and staircase are encased in marble, and the lobby bathroom is decorated in its original green Vitrolight.
