= Washington Pavilion of Arts and Science =

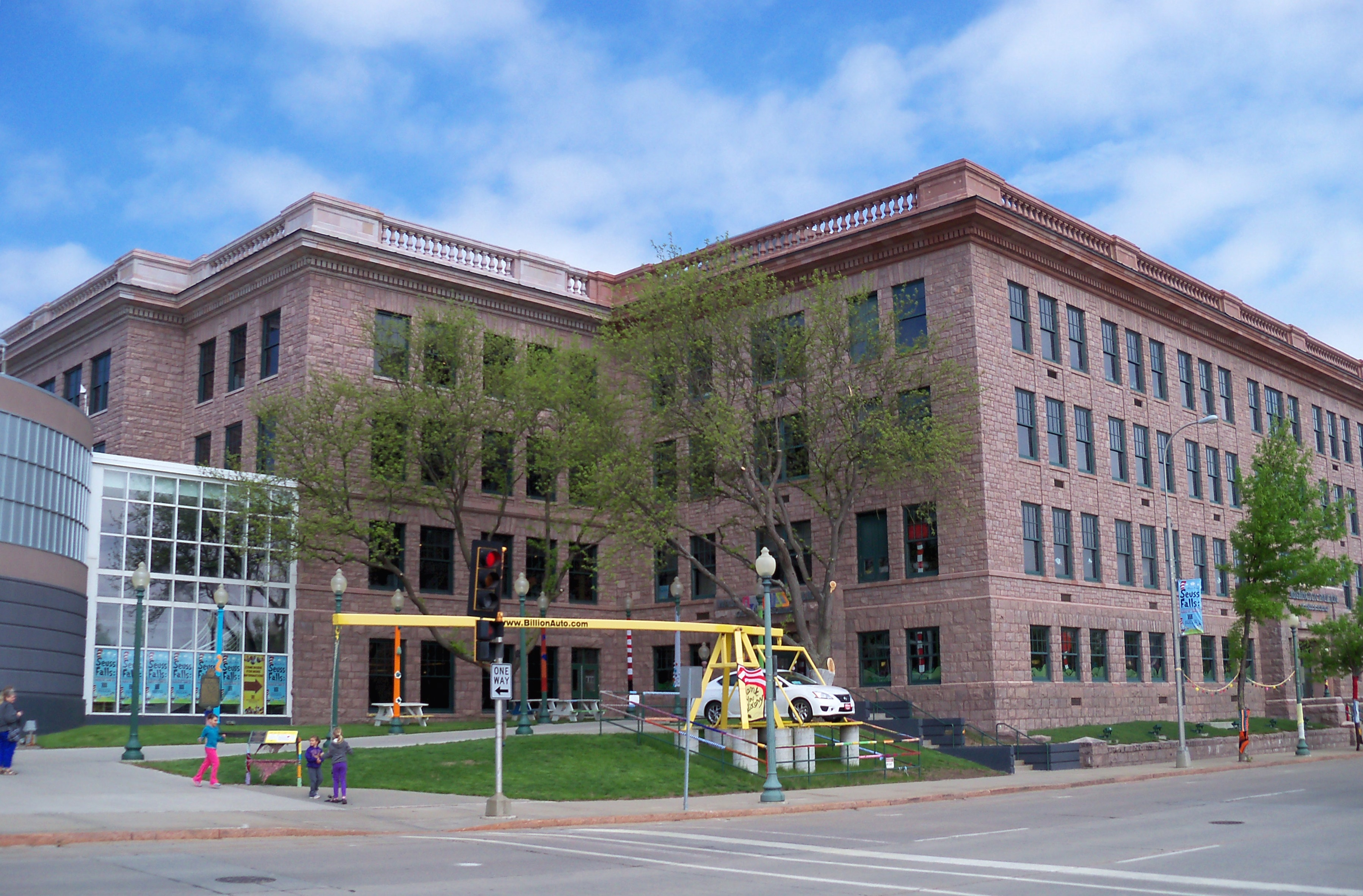
Exterior of the Washington Pavilion

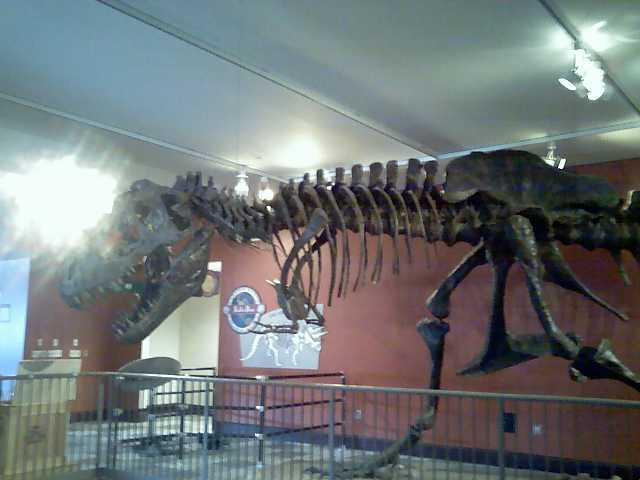
"Stan" the T-Rex fossil skeleton that is in the building.

The Washington Pavilion of Arts and Science opened in 1999 and houses an art gallery, concert hall, large-format theater, and science museum in Sioux Falls, South Dakota, United States. Its building, the former Washington High School, is listed on the National Register of Historic Places.

== History ==
- Washington High School
- U.S. National Register of Historic Places
- Location within South Dakota Location within the United States
- Location: 315 S. Main, Sioux Falls, South Dakota
- Coordinates: 43.544073°N 96.729035°W
- Area: 1 acre (0.40 ha)
- Built: 1908
- Architect: Joseph Schwartz et al.
- Architectural style: Classical Revival
- NRHP reference No.: 86000248
- Added to NRHP: February 13, 1986

The Pavilion was a result of a renovation of the former building of Washington High School which was eventually moved to the northeast side of the city. The building is of Neoclassical styling and is architecturally interesting. It was designed by Sioux Falls architect Joseph Schwartz. The building's facade is created from large blocks of Sioux Quartzite, a pinkish quartzite native to the area and seen at the falls of the Big Sioux River. A small portion of the north wing is constructed of black rock which was believed to be black quartzite but is in fact corson diabase, which is hardened liquid magma.

It was listed on the National Register of Historic Places in 1986.

== Contents ==
The Washington Pavilion of Arts and Science contains the Kirby Science Discovery Center, a massive 3 floor, regional, hands-on science experience.

The Pavilion also houses two performing arts centers, which play host to several Broadway productions, operas, dance and concert productions. The South Dakota Symphony's home also hosts dance groups as well as smaller theater and choral events.

The Visual Arts Center, hosts seven galleries of changing exhibits, and the Egger gallery which hosts the Northern Plains Tribal Art collection. The VAC hosts a variety local, regional and nationwide exhibitions, as well as Blockbuster exhibitions like Rodin, Andy Warhol, Ansel Adams and Toulouse-Lautrec. There are also many opportunities to participate in public programs like movies, panel discussions, art workshops, major events, etc. The VAC is free on Tuesdays, Saturday Mornings and the evenings of the First Friday of every month; otherwise there is a small fee.

The Wells Fargo Cinedome is a multiformat 60 ft dome theater which plays several different films per year. Virtually every space within the Pavilion is available for rent for business functions, weddings, receptions and conventions. The Washington Pavilion during 2023 started renovations on their cinedome turning it into the Sweetman Planetarium
