= Watertown Commercial Historic District (Watertown, South Dakota) =

Historic district in South Dakota, United States

- U.S. National Register of Historic Places
- U.S. Historic district
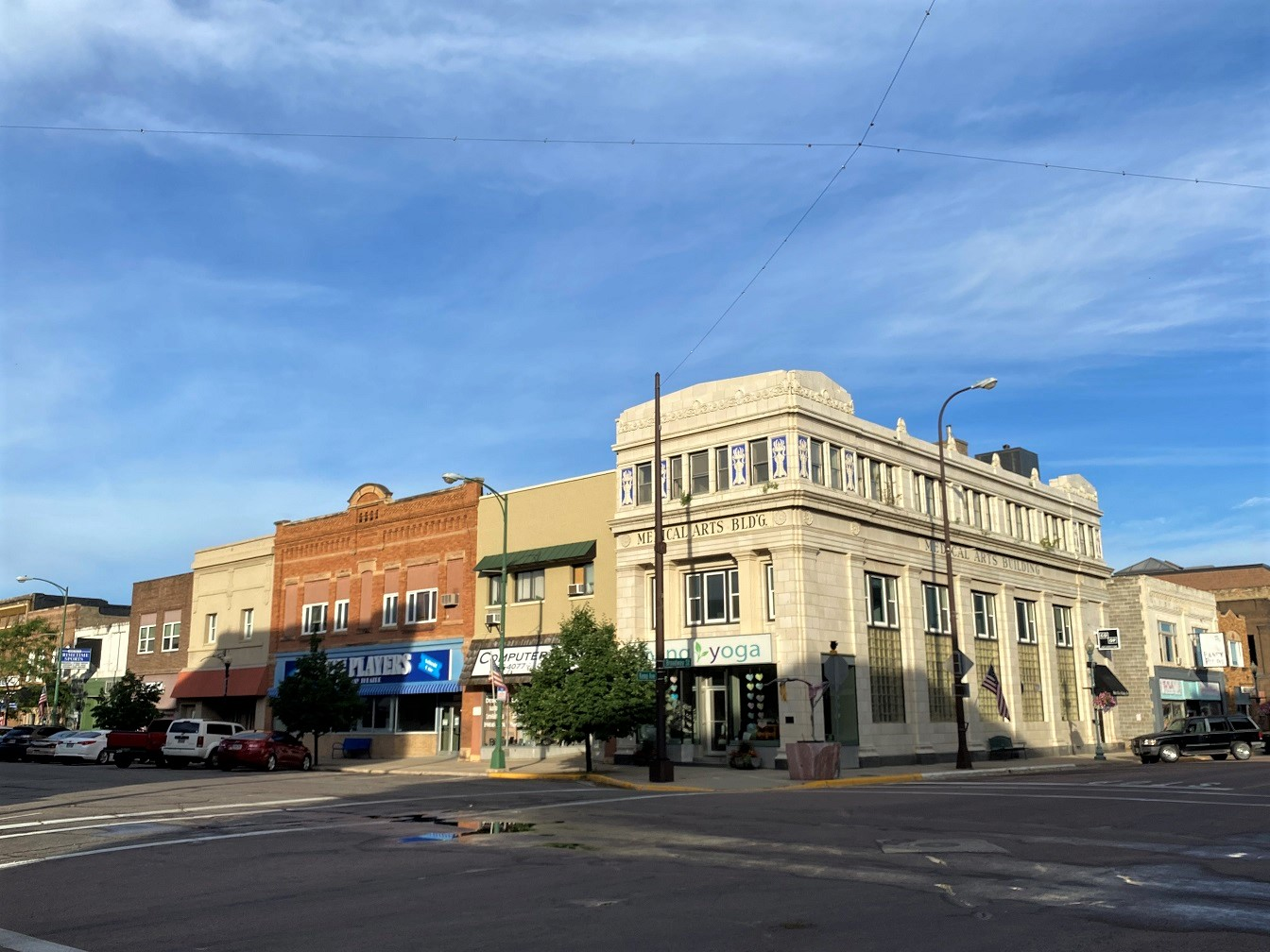

- Location within South Dakota Location within the United States
- Location: Roughly bounded by First Ave. N., Third St. E., Second Ave. S., and First St. W., Watertown, South Dakota
- Coordinates: 44°54′00″N 97°06′49″W
- Area: 22 acres (8.9 ha)
- Built: 1936
- Architect: Maurice A. Hockman
- Architectural style: Chicago, Classical Revival, Commercial Style
- NRHP reference No.: 89000834; 100006064 (decrease)

Significant dates
- Added to NRHP: July 13, 1989
- Boundary decrease: January 29, 2021

The Watertown Commercial Historic District is a 22 acres (8.9 ha) historic district in Watertown, South Dakota. It is roughly bounded by First Ave. N., Third St. E., Second Ave. S., and First St. W.

It includes works by Watertown architect Maurice A. Hockman.

It includes 69 contributing buildings and 47 non-contributing ones.

It includes the Codington County Courthouse and the Carnegie Free Public Library, which are separately listed on the National Register.
