= George S. S. Codington =

American politician

George S. S. Codington was a politician in the Dakota Territory. He was a member of the Dakota Territorial House of Representatives in now Brookings County, South Dakota. Aside from politics, he served as a minister. He died from tuberculosis in Wisconsin.

Codington County, South Dakota is named for him.
