= Holy Rosary Church (Kranzburg, South Dakota) =

Historic church in South Dakota, United States

- U.S. National Register of Historic Places
- Location within South Dakota Location within the United States
- Location: Minnesota Ave., Kranzburg, South Dakota
- Coordinates: 44°53′35″N 96°55′1″W
- Area: 1.3 acres (0.53 ha)
- Built: 1898
- Built by: Kuhn, John & Walter
- Architect: Schwartz, Joseph
- Architectural style: Gothic Revival
- NRHP reference No.: 86001227
- Added to NRHP: June 6, 1986

The Holy Rosary Church in Kranzburg, South Dakota is a historic Roman Catholic church building on Minnesota Avenue. It was built in 1898 and was added to the National Register of Historic Places in 1986.

It was designed by Sioux Falls architect Joseph Schwarz, Sr.

St. Joseph's Church at Waverly was a mission of Holy Rosary for many years before its closure.

== Restoration ==
Several construction and restoration projects have been conducted on the church in recent decades. In the early 1990s, the interior of the church was renovated, including the removal of the communion rail and the re-carpeting of the entire church. The exterior of the building received tuck pointing, as well as steeple repair. The early 2000s saw the addition of a new shingle roof over the church and steeple. 2008 brought the arrival of an entire new face-lift of the interior, with insulation added and the painting of the ornate moulding inside the church. Most recently, all of the stained glass windows in the church were removed and subsequently cleaned and put back together in 2015, using new lead framing. A new handicap accessible restroom was also added in 2015, requiring the confessional to be relocated.
