= Central Fire Station (Sioux Falls, South Dakota) =

- U.S. National Register of Historic Places
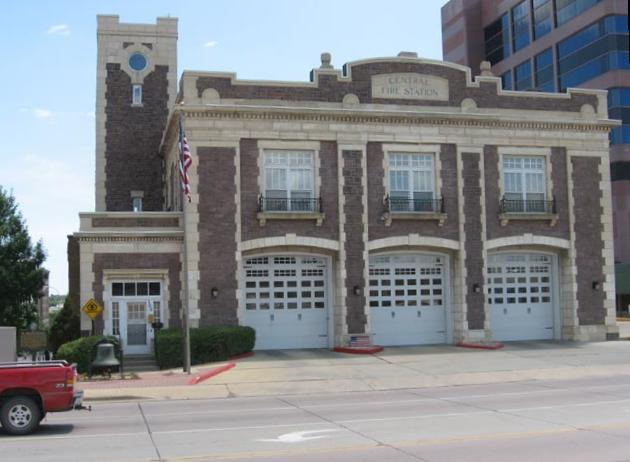

- Location within South Dakota Location within the United States
- Location: 100 S. Minnesota Ave., Sioux Falls, South Dakota
- Coordinates: 43°32′49″N 96°43′51″W
- Area: less than one acre
- Built: 1913
- Architect: Joseph Schwarz
- NRHP reference No.: 80003730
- Added to NRHP: May 27, 1980

The Central Fire Station of Sioux Falls, South Dakota, also known as Station No. 1, at 100 S. Minnesota Ave., was built in 1913. It was listed on the National Register of Historic Places in 1980.

It was designed by architect Joseph Schwarz to hold horse-drawn fire apparatuses, and to stable the horses.
