= Harold Spitznagel =

American architect (1896–1975)

- Born: 7 December 1896; Sioux Falls, South Dakota
- Died: 26 April 1975 (aged 78)
- Other name: "Spitz"
- Education: Art Institute of Chicago; University of Pennsylvania
- Occupation: Architect
- Awards: South Dakota Hall of Fame; Fellow of the American Institute of Architects; honorary doctorate
- Buildings: Sioux Falls City Hall; Mount Rushmore Visitor Center; Sioux Falls Arena; Sylvan Lake Lodge

Harold Theodore Spitznagel (December 7, 1896 – April 26, 1975) was an American architect from South Dakota. Spitznagel was best known for residential and institutional architecture, including the original Mount Rushmore visitor center. His styles included Prairie School, Art Deco, and Moderne architecture. He graduated from the University of Pennsylvania, was posthumously inducted into the South Dakota Hall of Fame, and has been called the "foremost 20th-century architect" of the state of South Dakota.

== Life ==
=== Early life and education ===
Spitznagel was born in Sioux Falls, South Dakota, on December 7, 1896, to Mary and Charles Spitznagel. He graduated from Washington High School in 1916. For two years he attended the Art Institute of Chicago, and earned his Bachelor of Architecture degree from the University of Pennsylvania in 1925. At school he won the American Institute of Architects and Arthur Spayd Brooke design awards. For a brief time after graduation, Spitznagel was an assistant instructor in architecture at the University of Pennsylvania.

=== Career ===
Spitznagel worked in Indianapolis for six months, then moved to Chicago. There he was an architect first for Burnham Brothers (commercial design, 1926), then Graven and Mayger (movie theaters, 1926-1927), and finally Schmidt, Garden, and Erickson (commercial design and hospitals, 1927-1929). The latter firm was influential in Chicago's Prairie School style of residential architecture. In 1930 at the beginning of the Great Depression, Spitznagel returned home to Sioux Falls and opened an office in the Western Surety Building on Eighth Street and Main Avenue. He remodeled this office into the Art Deco style.

Spitznagel and his firms (Harold Spitznagel Architects, Harold Spitznagel & Associates, Inc., and The Spitznagel Partners, Inc.) designed many buildings, especially in South Dakota, in the 1930s through 1970s. His first work was residential and small retail, and in 1936 the city commissioned him to design the Sioux Falls City Hall. This Moderne building included limestone plaques, granite carvings, frescoes and—controversially—no cornice. Spitznagel incorporated a significant amount of art in the building design, influenced by Palmer Eide of Augustana College. Spitznagel and Eide collaborated over the next decades on buildings such as Jehovah Evangelical Lutheran Church in Saint Paul, Minnesota.

In the late 1930s, Senator Peter Norbeck asked Frank Lloyd Wright to submit a design for a new Custer State Park lodge. Wright toured the site but declined to participate. The park board then chose Spitznagel's firm to design the lodge, which included rustic and Deco elements. During World War II, Spitznagel was Director of Housing for Sioux Falls Army Air Field.

Spitznagel's mid-career was highlighted by institutional buildings: civic structures like city halls and post offices, arenas in Sioux Falls and Huron, and high-profile park buildings for the Mount Rushmore National Memorial and Custer State Park. The Mission 66 Mount Rushmore visitor center was finished in 1957 in a collaboration with Cecil Doty, and featured in the 1959 Alfred Hitchcock film North by Northwest.

Spitznagel designed hotels, country clubs, and movie theaters. Educational buildings were a particular specialty, and Spitznagel was the architect for buildings on the campuses of the University of South Dakota, South Dakota State University, and Augustana College. His firm took on many sacred architecture projects, including an award-winning church in Saint Paul, Minnesota: Jehovah Lutheran.

Spitznagel retired in June 1972 and died on April 26, 1975.

=== Legacy ===
Spitznagel served as president of the South Dakota chapter of the American Institute of Architects in 1954–1955 and vice president of the national organization from 1966 to 1970.

His papers are in the archives of the University of Minnesota Libraries. Augustana College occasionally bestows a Harold Spitznagel Medal for Achievement in Art to students who demonstrate excellence in their field.

== Work ==
=== Buildings ===
==== 1930s ====
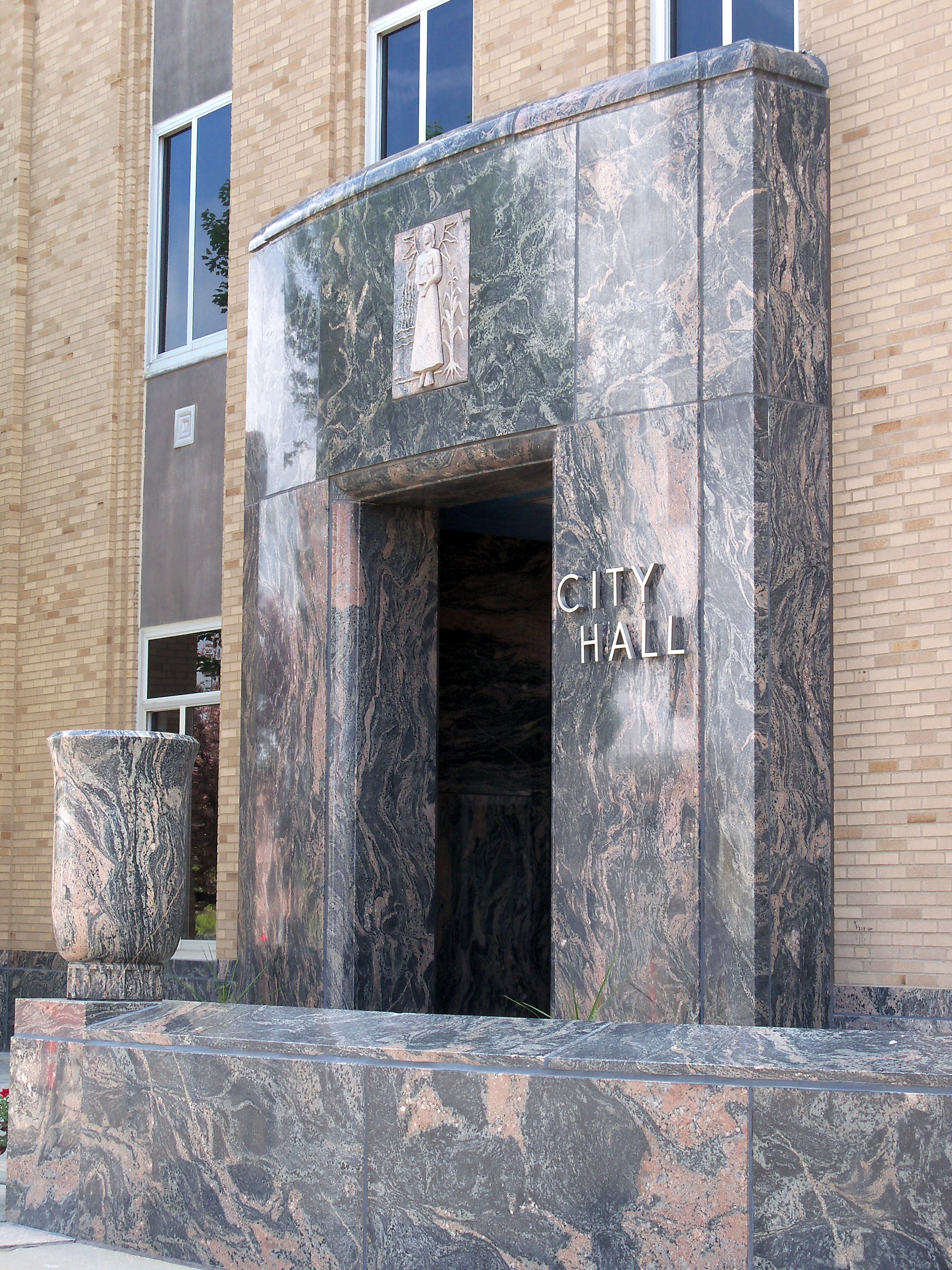
Sioux Falls City Hall doorway

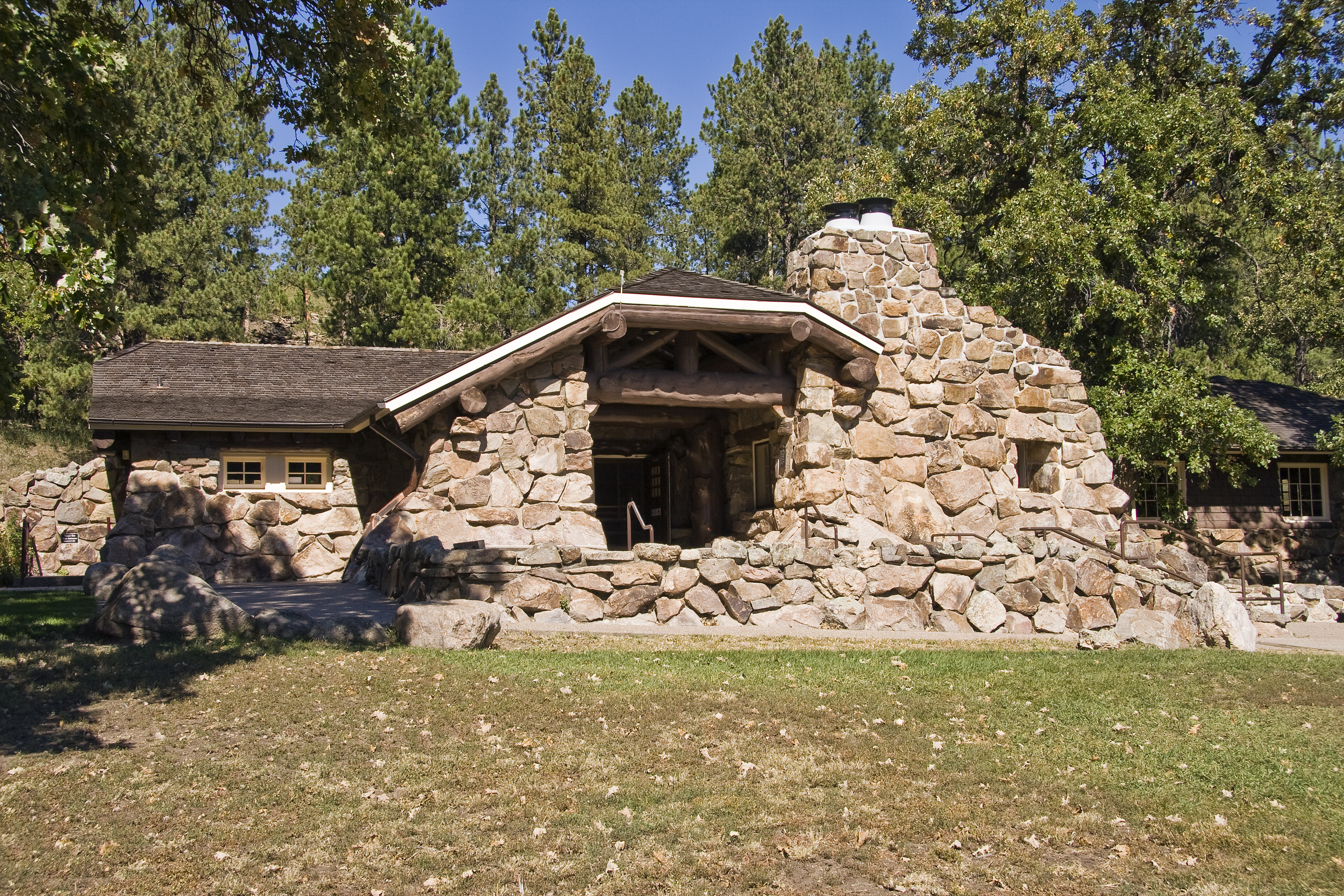
Peter Norbeck Visitor Center, Custer State Park

- Sioux Falls City Hall
- Peter Norbeck Visitor Center and Sylvan Lake Lodge, Custer State Park
- Sioux Falls residences
- Irving School and Lincoln High School addition in Sioux Falls; grade school in Ellsworth, Minnesota
- KSOO-FM radio station
- department store in Brookings, South Dakota
- Hollywood Theater in Sioux Falls

==== 1940s ====
- John Morrell and Company Visitor Building, Sioux Falls
- South Dakota State Penitentiary cell block
- Sport Bowl, Sioux Falls
- Carpenter Hotel, Sioux Falls
- Sioux Falls residences
- Central Electric and Telephone Company, Sioux Falls
- retail stores
- Augustana College master plan

==== 1950s ====
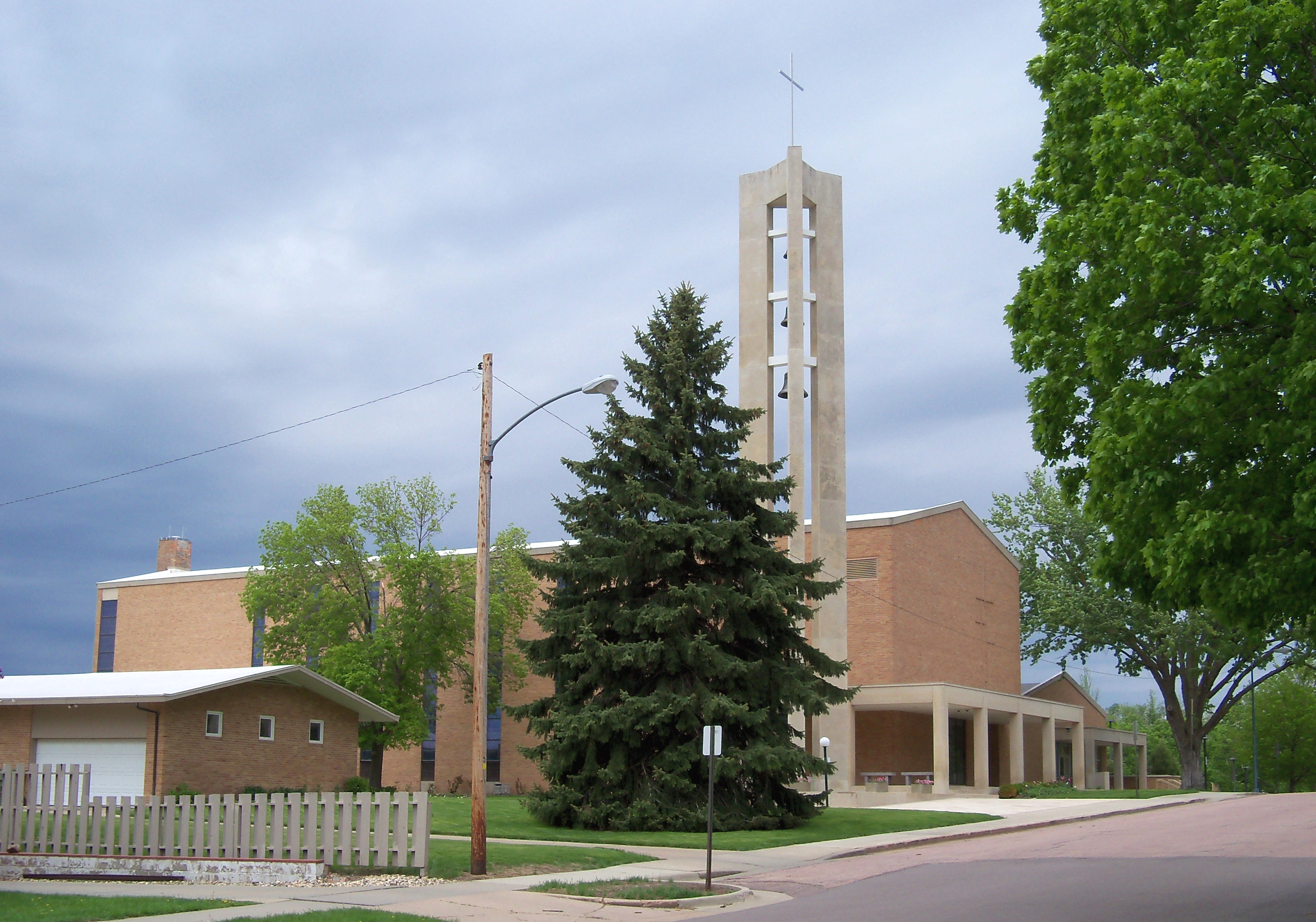
St. Mary's Catholic Church Sioux Falls

- Huron Arena, Huron, South Dakota
- YWCA, Sioux Falls
- Augustana College Commons
- First Congregational Church, Spencer, Iowa
- Church of St. Mary, Sioux Falls
- Our Savior’s Lutheran Church with chancel art by Robert Aldern, Sioux Falls
- Western Surety Company, Sioux Falls
- First Congregational Church, Rapid City
- Hanel Motor Hotel, Minneapolis
- Dowling Hall, University of St. Thomas (Minnesota), Saint Paul

==== 1960s ====
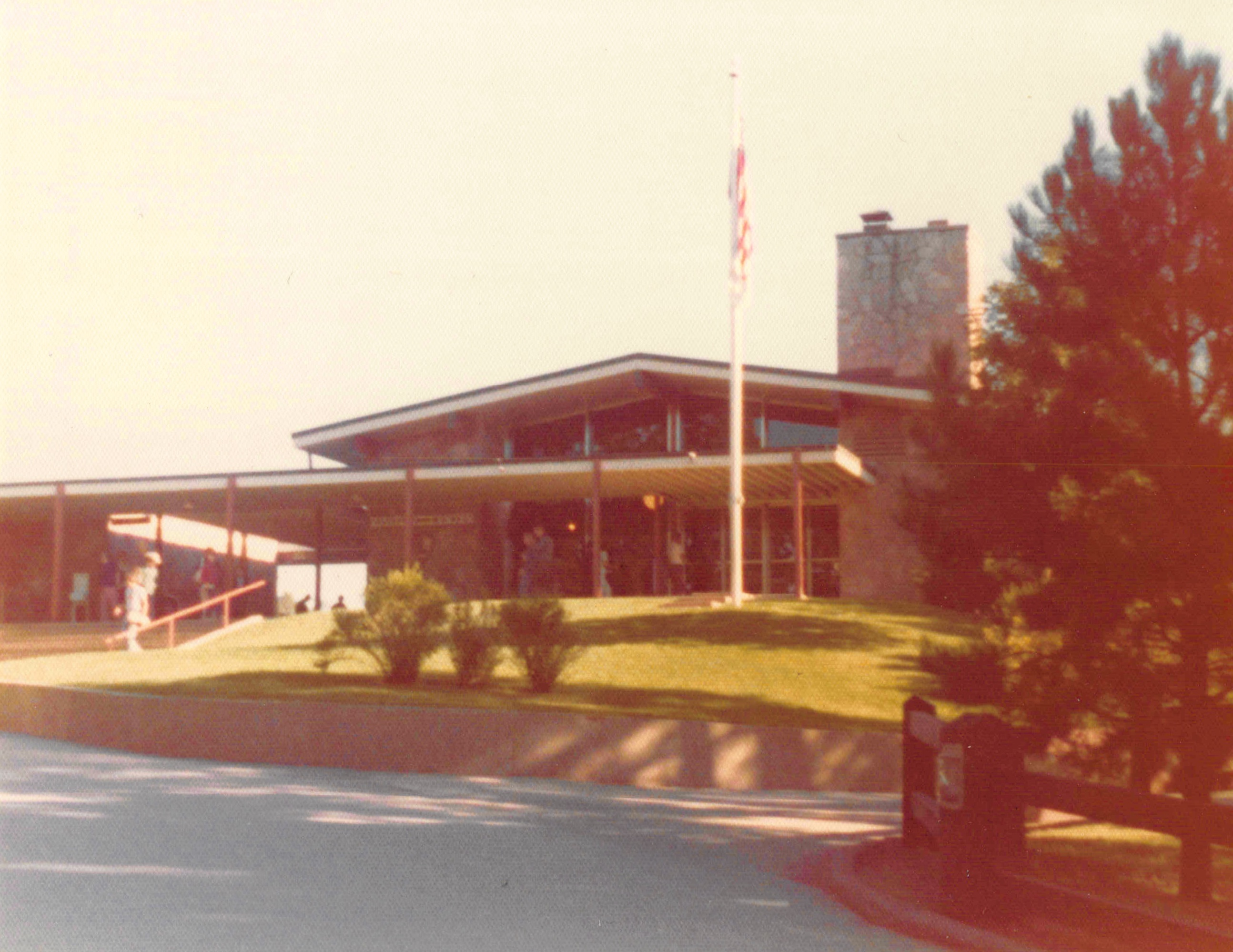
Mount Rushmore National Memorial Visitor Center circa 1976

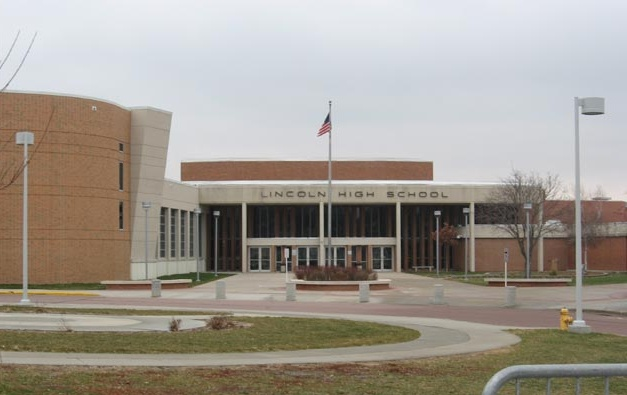
Lincoln High School, Sioux Falls

- Sioux Falls Arena, Sioux Falls
- Mount Rushmore Visitor Center (original), with Cecil Doty
- Minnehaha Country Club, Sioux Falls
- National Bank of South Dakota, Sioux Falls
- USD Student Union, Vermillion
- Lincoln Senior High School, Sioux Falls
- Augustana College Science Building, Sioux Falls
- Holy Name Catholic Church, Watertown, South Dakota
- First Federal Savings and Loan, Sioux Falls
- Trinity Lutheran Church with suspended art by Palmer Eide, Spencer, Iowa
- American College Testing Program, Iowa City
- South Dakota State University Rotunda/Arts and Science/Home Economics and Nursing, dining hall, and dormitories
- Le Mars Community High School, Le Mars IA
- Housing and Urban Development Housing for the Elderly, Pipestone, Minnesota
- Jehovah Lutheran Church, Saint Paul, Minnesota; dedicated March 7, A.D. 1964
- Bethlehem Evangelical Lutheran Church edifice, dedicated November 3, A.D. 1968 - Sanctuary/Nave/Narthex/Undercroft; 64 nave paintings of historical Christian leaders by Cyrus B. Running (1913-1976), Mankato, Minnesota

==== 1970s ====
- South Dakota State Library, Pierre
- Avera McKennan Hospital addition, Sioux Falls
- Federal office building, Aberdeen
- EROS Data Center, Garretson
- Minnehaha County Public Safety Building, Sioux Falls
- Rapid City Civic Center, Rapid City
- Hilton M. Briggs Library, South Dakota State University, Brookings
- Post office, Watertown, South Dakota
- Fine Arts Center, University of South Dakota, Vermillion

=== Awards ===
- 1935: House and Garden magazine feature
- 1951: Better Homes and Gardens magazine feature
- 1956: honorary doctorate from Augustana College
- 1959: Fellow of the American Institute of Architects
- 1962, 1970, 1975: Northwest Architect magazine feature
- 1975: four-city, four-month posthumous exhibition
- 2006: South Dakota Hall of Fame inductee, posthumously
