= Lyon County Courthouse (Iowa) =

- U.S. National Register of Historic Places
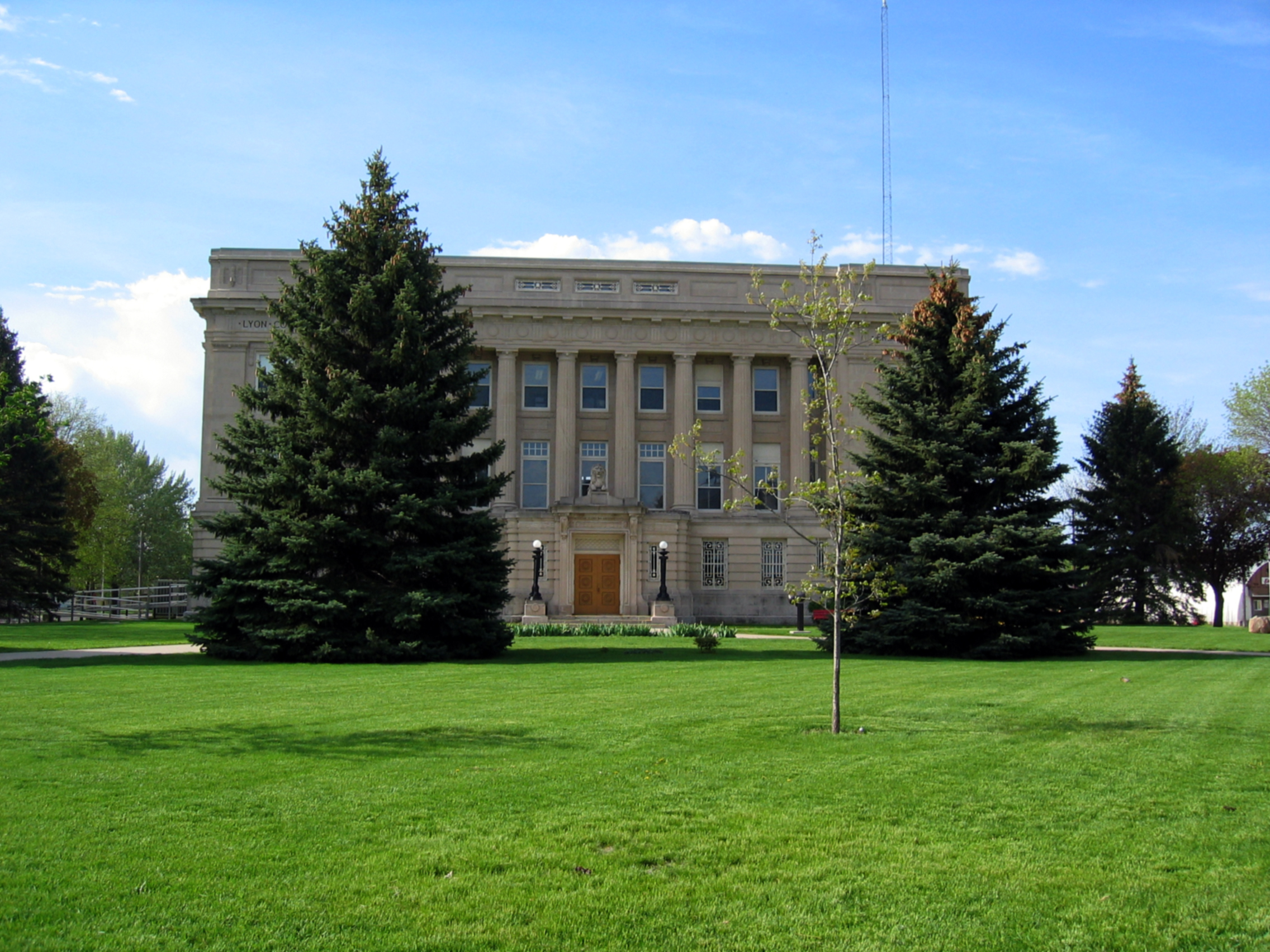
- Lyon County Courthouse

- Location within Iowa Location within the United States
- Location: 3rd and Story Sts. Rock Rapids, Iowa
- Coordinates: 43°25′48″N 96°10′02″W
- Area: less than one acre
- Built: 1916-1917
- Built by: Amwold Construction
- Architect: Joseph Schwartz
- Architectural style: Beaux-Arts
- MPS: County Courthouses in Iowa TR
- NRHP reference No.: 79000913
- Added to NRHP: October 1, 1979

The Lyon County Courthouse is located in Rock Rapids, Iowa, United States. It was listed on the National Register of Historic Places in 1979. The courthouse is the second building the county has used for court functions and county administration.

== History ==
Lyon County was organized in 1872, and county business was done in the private homes of county officials in Beloit. In 1873 Rock Rapids was chosen as the county seat because of its central location, and the first courthouse was erected in 1875. It was a three-story frame structure with a hipped roof and bracketed eaves. The building was moved a few blocks away and became an apartment building after it was stuccoed and painted green. The present courthouse was begun in 1916 and was completed the following year for $109,695.13.

== Architecture ==
The courthouse was designed in the Beaux-Arts style by Sioux Falls architect Joseph Schwartz. The main facade has a loggia in the center that features eight columns from the second floor to the top of the third floor with recessed windows in between. The cornice runs below the wide band along the roofline, which is flat. The Bedford stone clad building measures approximately 110 by 71 feet (34 by 22 m) and is 52 feet (16 m) high. A lion couchant is located above the main entrance, and is a play on the county's name Lyon. The central rotunda on the interior features an art glass skylight dome and the county seal in a mosaic of ceramic tile on the floor. Wainscoting in the main staircases and corridors is Italian marble. Four murals on the third floor are named Pioneer, Immigrant, Rock Rapids 1873, and Modern Farm 1917. They are possibly the work of William Peaco, who has similar murals in the Greene County Courthouse in Jefferson.
