= Rock Rapids United Methodist Church =

- First Methodist Church
- U.S. National Register of Historic Places
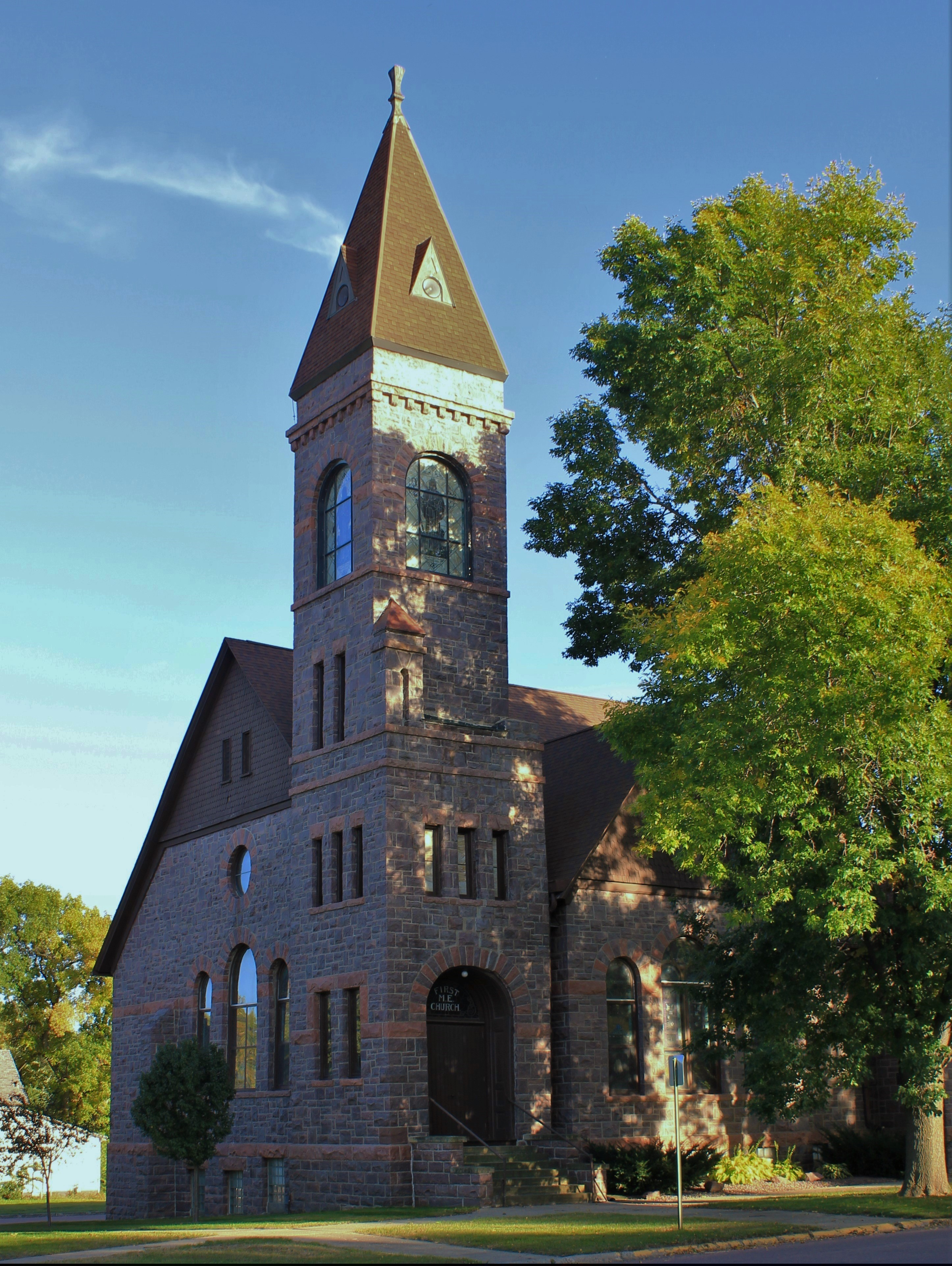

- Location within Iowa Location within the United States
- Location: 302 S. Carroll St. Rock Rapids, Iowa
- Coordinates: 43°25′45″N 96°10′19″W
- Area: less than one acre
- Built: 1895-1896
- Architect: Joseph Schwartz
- Architectural style: Richardsonian Romanesque
- NRHP reference No.: 78001244
- Added to NRHP: June 23, 1978

Rock Rapids United Methodist Church, formerly known as First Methodist Church, is located in Rock Rapids, Iowa, United States. The church building is significant for the use of blue-gray and red granite used in its construction. It was designed by Sioux Falls, South Dakota architect Joseph Schwartz utilizing the Richardsonian Romanesque style. Completed in 1896, it is the second church building for a congregation founded in the 1870s. The blue-gray granite quarried near Sioux Falls is the main building material, and it is laid in a random ashlar pattern. The red granite was acquired from the receiver of a bankrupt packing plant which had begun, but did not complete, a new stone building. It is used for the trim, especially in the voussoirs of alternating colors. The building also features a tall corner bell tower. The pipe organ was ordered from the Hinners Organ Company of Pekin, Illinois in January 1905 at a cost of $1,960 (equivalent to $70,000 in 2025). An addition was added to the south side of the church in 1966. The church was added to the National Register of Historic Places in 1978.
