= Pipestone Public Library =

- U.S. National Register of Historic Places
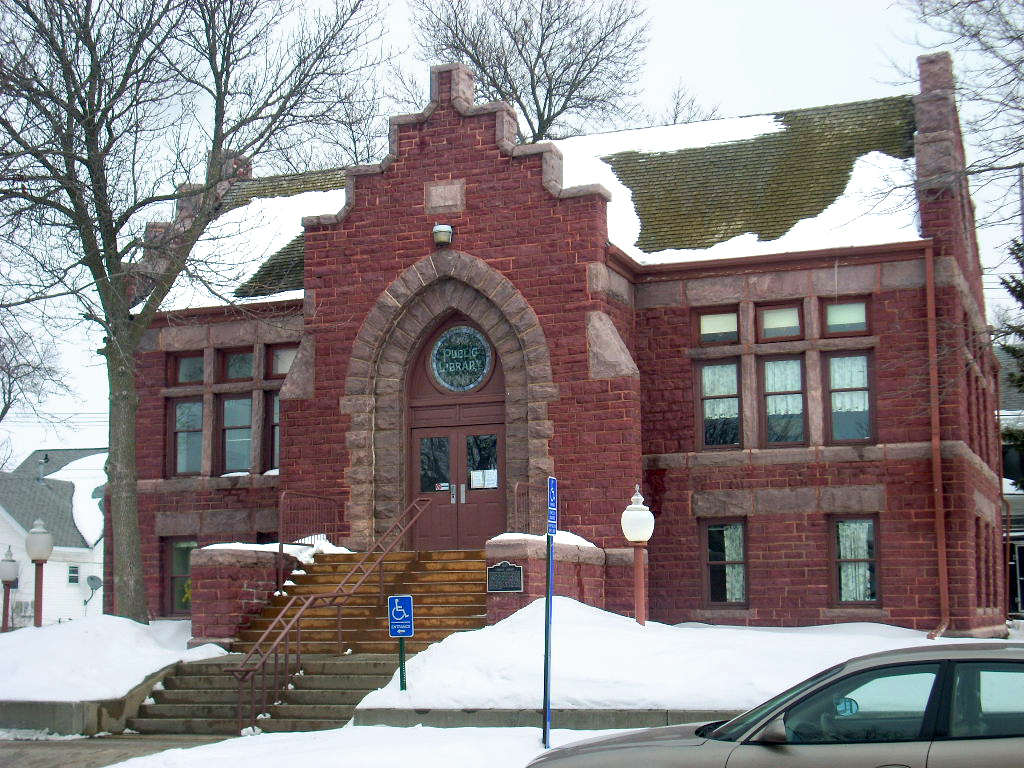

- Location within Minnesota Location within the United States
- Location: 3rd St., SE and S. Hiawatha Ave., Pipestone, Minnesota
- Coordinates: 43°59′54″N 96°19′1″W
- Area: 0 acres (0 ha)
- Built: 1904
- Built by: Redmon, George S.
- Architect: Joseph Schwartz
- MPS: Pipestone County MRA
- NRHP reference No.: 80002122
- Added to NRHP: March 3, 1980

Pipestone Public Library in Pipestone, Minnesota, United States, is a Carnegie library that was built in 1904. It was an important work of architect Joseph Schwartz. It was listed on the U.S. National Register of Historic Places in 1980.

The building is made of Sioux quartzite.
