= A.C. Gilruth House =

Historic house in South Dakota, United States

- A. C. Gilruth House
- U.S. National Register of Historic Places
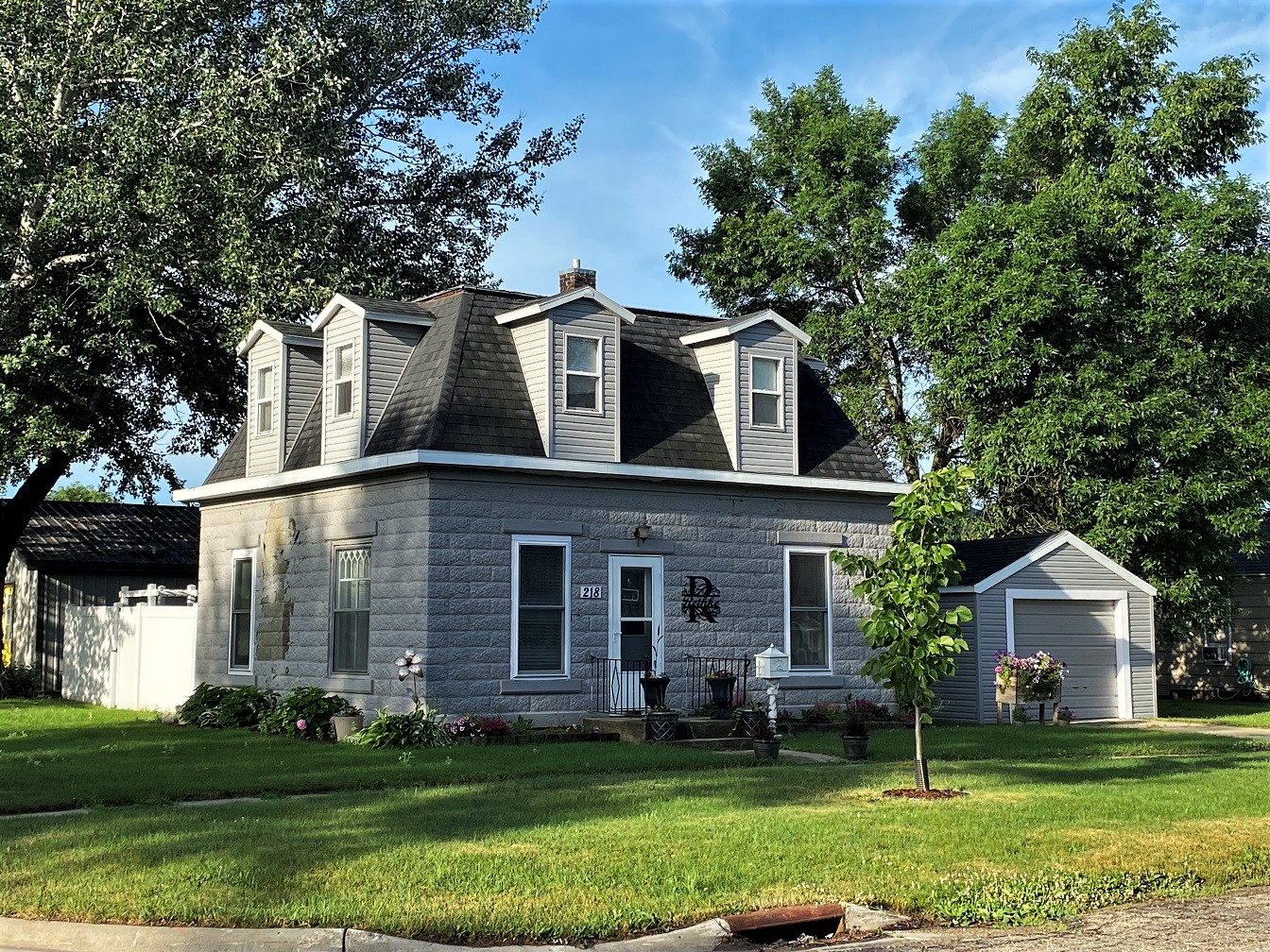

- Location within South Dakota Location within the United States
- Location: 218 Second Ave. NE; Watertown, South Dakota
- Coordinates: 44°54′14″N 97°06′31″W
- Area: less than one acre
- Built: 1908
- Architectural style: One-and-one-half Story Cube
- MPS: North End Neighborhood MPS
- NRHP reference No.: 88003031
- Added to NRHP: January 3, 1989

The A. C. Gilruth House, located at 218 Second Ave. NE in Watertown, South Dakota, was built in 1908. It was listed on the National Register of Historic Places in 1989.

It was deemed significant as "a good example of the smaller homes built in the North End Neighborhood, Watertown, South Dakota, after the turn of the century."

It is a one-and-a-half-story ornamental concrete block masonry (cast stone) structure.
