= Jorden Hall =

- U.S. National Register of Historic Places
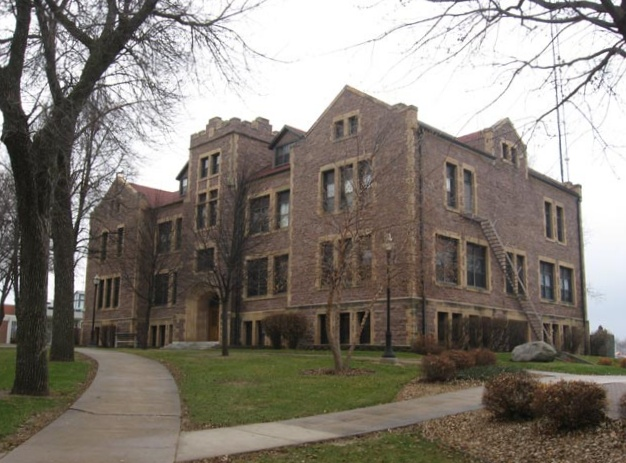
- Jorden Hall

- Location within South Dakota Location within the United States
- Location: 1101 W. 22nd St., Sioux Falls, South Dakota
- Coordinates: 43°31′56″N 96°44′19″W
- Area: less than one acre
- Built: 1908
- Architect: Joseph Schwarz
- Architectural style: Gothic Revival
- NRHP reference No.: 00001349
- Added to NRHP: November 8, 2000

Jorden Hall is a historic building located on the campus of the University of Sioux Falls in Sioux Falls, South Dakota. It was designed by architect Joseph Schwarz and built in 1908. It is the oldest building remaining at the University of Sioux Falls.

It was listed on the National Register of Historic Places in 2000 for its representation of the gothic revival architectural style.
