= John B. Hanten House =

Historic house in South Dakota, United States

- U.S. National Register of Historic Places
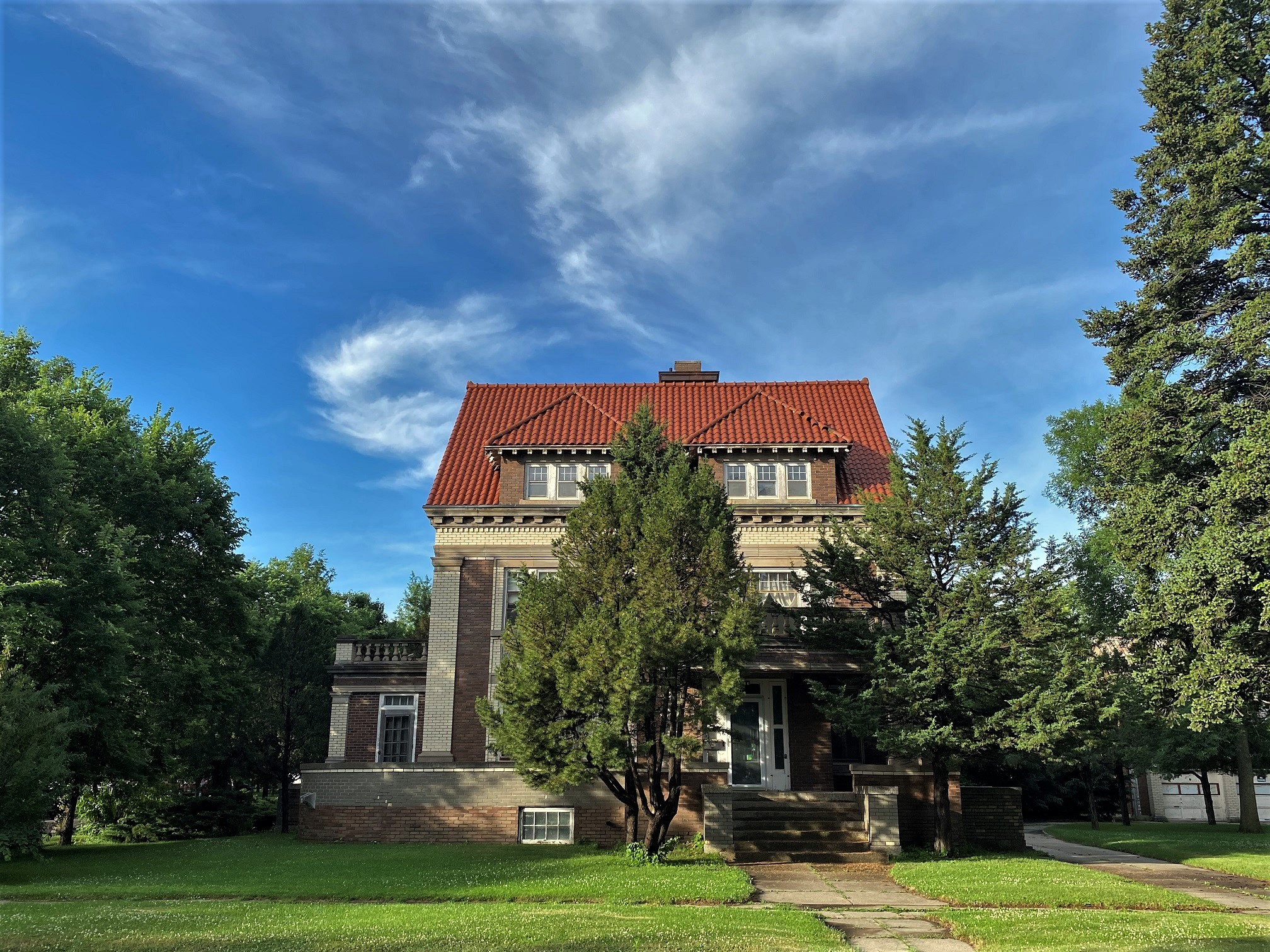

- Location within South Dakota Location within the United States
- Location: 518 E. Kemp Ave. Watertown, South Dakota
- Coordinates: 44°53′54″N 97°06′19″W
- Area: less than one acre
- Built: 1913
- Built by: Ben Byer
- Architect: Maurice A. Hockman
- Architectural style: Colonial Revival
- NRHP reference No.: 89002337
- Added to NRHP: January 26, 1990

The John B. Hanten House, located at 518 E. Kemp Ave. in Watertown, South Dakota, was built in 1913. It was listed on the National Register of Historic Places in 1990.

It is an "imposing" three-story building upon a full basement which is "one of the finest houses in the city". Its masonry walls are built of structural tile and clad with dark bronze vitrified brick laid in running bond. It has Doric pilasters at its corners.

It was deemed "significant in the area of architecture, because it is one of the few known surviving examples of domestic housing designed by Watertown, South Dakota, architect Maurice A. Hockman.

In 1940 it was donated to serve as a rectory for the Immaculate Conception Parish.
