= Dr. Tarbell House =

Historic house in South Dakota, United States

- U.S. National Register of Historic Places
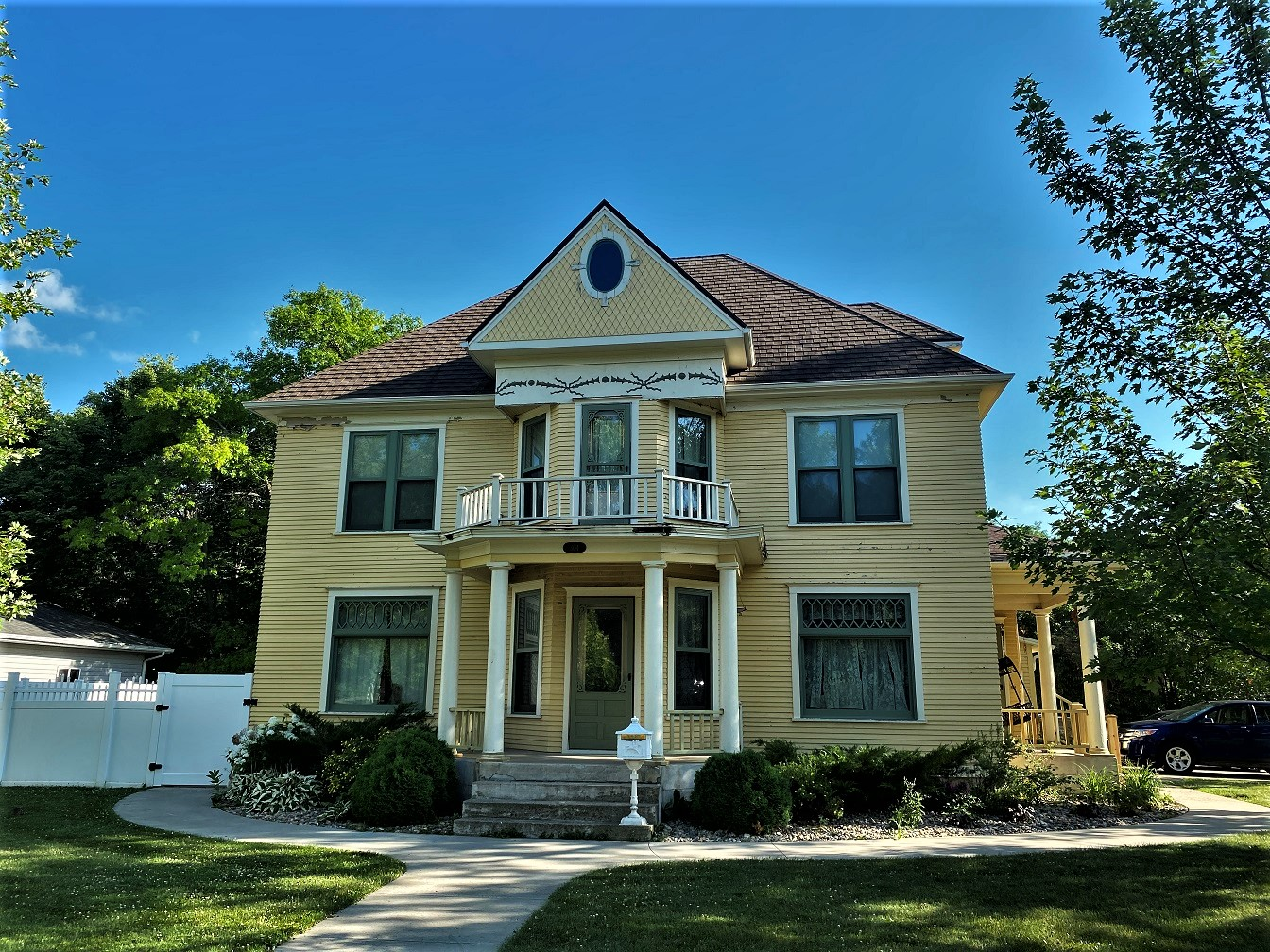

- Location within South Dakota Location within the United States
- Location: 304 Second Ave. SE; Watertown, South Dakota
- Coordinates: 44°53′49″N 97°06′36″W
- Area: less than one acre
- Built: 1904
- Architectural style: Colonial Revival
- NRHP reference No.: 01000634
- Added to NRHP: June 6, 2001

The Dr. Tarbell House, located at 304 Second Ave. SE in Watertown, South Dakota, was built in 1904. It was listed on the National Register of Historic Places in 2001.

It is a Colonial Revival style house with a hipped roof, on a stone foundation. Its front, north-facing facade has a two-story cantered bay window topped by a pediment.
