= Codington County, South Dakota =

County in South Dakota, United States

- County
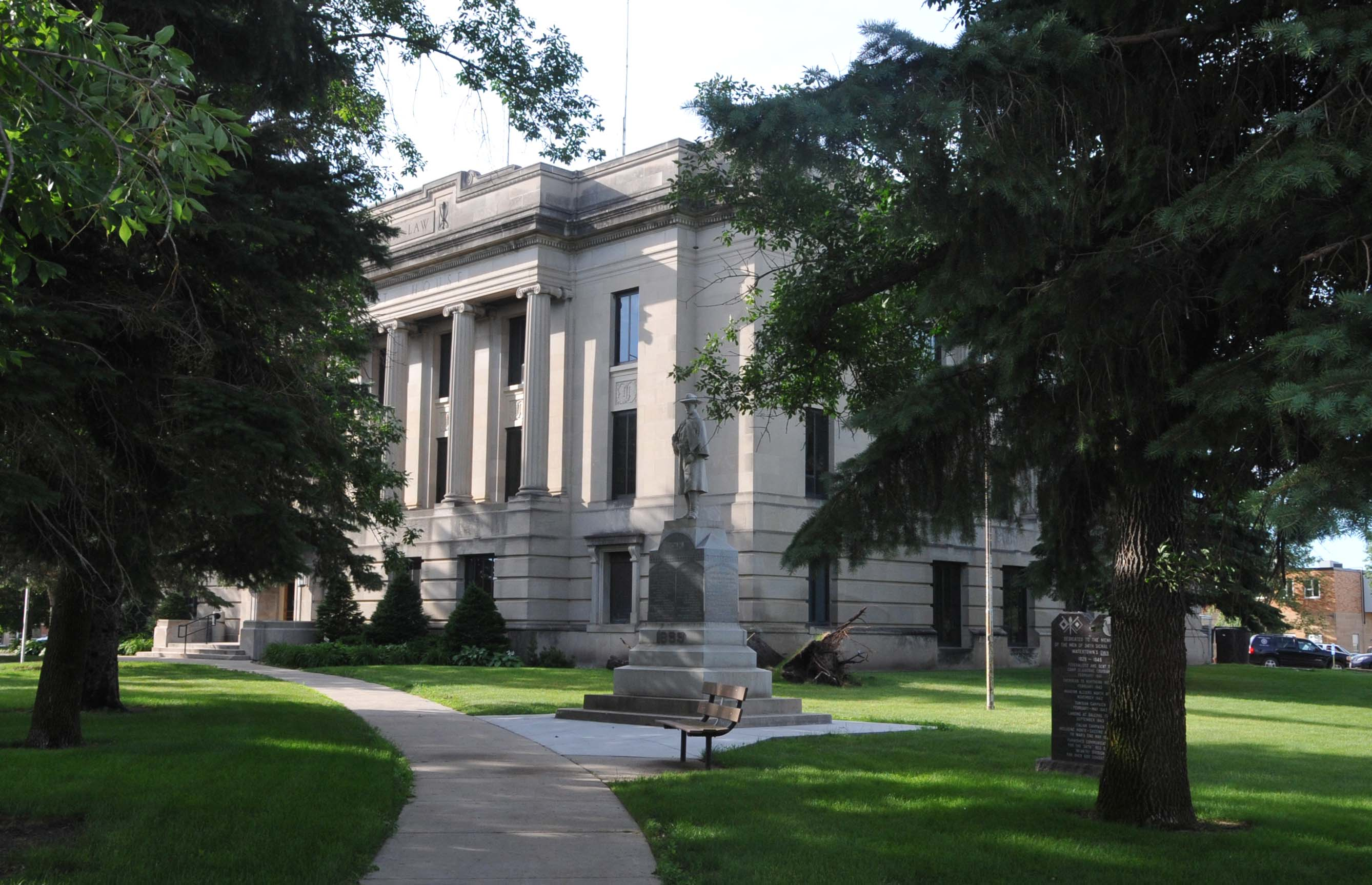
- Codington County Courthouse in July 2013

- Location within the U.S. state of South Dakota
- Coordinates: 44°59′N 97°11′W
- Country: United States
- State: South Dakota
- Created: 1877
- Organized: 1878
- Named for: Reverend George S. S. Codington
- Seat: Watertown
- Largest city: Watertown

Area
  - Total: 717 sq mi (1,860 km^{2})
  - Land: 688 sq mi (1,780 km^{2})
  - Water: 29 sq mi (75 km^{2}) 4.0%

Population (2020)
  - Total: 28,325
  - Estimate (2025): 29,562 ▲
  - Density: 41.2/sq mi (15.9/km^{2})
- Time zone: UTC−6 (Central)
  - Summer (DST): UTC−5 (CDT)
- Congressional district: At-large
- Website: codington.sdcounty.gov

Codington County is a county in the U.S. state of South Dakota. As of the 2020 census, the population was 28,325, making it the 7th most populous county in South Dakota. Its county seat is Watertown. The county was created in 1877 and organized in 1878. It is named for Rev. George S. S. Codington, Dakota Territory legislator.

Codington County comprises the Watertown, SD Micropolitan Statistical Area.

== Geography ==
Native vegetation based on NRCS soils information

Codington County terrain consists of rolling hills dotted with lakes and ponds, especially in the southwest portion. The land is largely devoted to agriculture. The terrain is higher on the county's east and west sides, and generally slopes to the south. The county has a total area of 717 square miles (1,860 km^{2}), of which 688 square miles (1,780 km^{2}) is land and 29 square miles (75 km^{2}) (4.0%) is water.

=== Major highways ===
- Interstate 29
- U.S. Highway 81
- U.S. Highway 212
- South Dakota Highway 20
- South Dakota Highway 20P

=== Transit ===
- Jefferson Lines

=== Adjacent counties ===
- Grant County – northeast
- Deuel County – southeast
- Hamlin County – south
- Clark County – west
- Day County – northwest

=== Protected areas ===
- American Game Association State Game Production Area
- Blythe State Game Production Area
- Christopherson Game Production Area
- Clarksean State Game Production Area
- Codington County State Game Production Area
- Curley State Game Production Area
- Elmore State Game Production Area
- Gilbert State Game Production Area
- Goose Lake State Game Production Area
- Hanson State Game Production Area
- Horseshoe Lake State Game Production Area
- Larson State Game Production Area
- McKillicans Lake State Game Production Area
- North Nichols State Game Production Area
- North Stink Lake State Game Production Area
- Pelican Lake State Recreation Area
- Punished Womans Lake State Game Production Area
- Sandy Shore State Recreation Area
- Spencer State Game Production Area
- Spoonbill Pass State Game Production Area
- Thompson's Point State Lakeside Use Area
- Warner Lake State Game Production Area
- Wolf State Game Production Area (partial)

=== Major lakes ===
- Cottonwood Lake
- Dry Lake
- Goose Lake
- Grass Lake
- Horseshoe Lake
- Kings Lake
- Lake Kampeska
- Lake Nicholson
- Long Lake
- McKillicans Lake
- Medicine Lake
- Pelican Lake
- Punished Womans Lake
- Round Lake
- Still Lake
- Warner Lake

== Demographics ==
Historical population
Census	Pop.	Note	%±
1880	2,156		—
1890	7,037		226.4%
1900	8,770		24.6%
1910	14,092		60.7%
1920	16,549		17.4%
1930	17,457		5.5%
1940	17,014		−2.5%
1950	18,944		11.3%
1960	20,220		6.7%
1970	19,140		−5.3%
1980	20,885		9.1%
1990	22,698		8.7%
2000	25,897		14.1%
2010	27,227		5.1%
2020	28,325		4.0%
2025 (est.)	29,562	▲	4.4%
U.S. Decennial Census; 1790–1960 1900–1990; 1990–2000 2010–2020

=== 2020 census ===
As of the 2020 census, there were 28,325 people, 12,026 households, and 7,199 families residing in the county. The population density was 41.2 inhabitants per square mile (15.9/km^{2}). There were 13,211 housing units, of which 9.0% were vacant; 66.6% of occupied housing units were owner-occupied and 33.4% were renter-occupied. The homeowner vacancy rate was 1.4% and the rental vacancy rate was 10.7%.

Of the residents, 23.4% were under the age of 18 and 18.5% were 65 years of age or older; the median age was 39.1 years. For every 100 females there were 101.7 males, and for every 100 females age 18 and over there were 101.9 males.

The racial makeup of the county was 92.1% White, 0.4% Black or African American, 2.4% American Indian and Alaska Native, 0.7% Asian, 0.9% from some other race, and 3.5% from two or more races. Hispanic or Latino residents of any race comprised 2.6% of the population.

Of those households, 27.2% had children under the age of 18 living with them and 24.3% had a female householder with no spouse or partner present. About 32.6% of all households were made up of individuals and 13.0% had someone living alone who was 65 years of age or older.

=== 2010 census ===
As of the 2010 census, there were 27,227 people, 11,432 households, and 7,216 families in the county. The population density was 39.5 inhabitants per square mile (15.3/km^{2}). There were 12,397 housing units at an average density of 18.0 per square mile (6.9/km^{2}). The racial makeup of the county was 95.3% white, 2.0% American Indian, 0.4% Asian, 0.3% black or African American, 0.6% from other races, and 1.3% from two or more races. Those of Hispanic or Latino origin made up 1.6% of the population. In terms of ancestry, 54.3% were German, 22.6% were Norwegian, 9.6% were Irish, 6.7% were English, and 3.3% were American.

Of the 11,432 households, 30.7% had children under the age of 18 living with them, 49.9% were married couples living together, 9.0% had a female householder with no husband present, 36.9% were non-families, and 30.6% of all households were made up of individuals. The average household size was 2.35 and the average family size was 2.93. The median age was 37.7 years.

The median income for a household in the county was $43,275 and the median income for a family was $60,202. Males had a median income of $39,076 versus $26,945 for females. The per capita income for the county was $24,781. About 8.9% of families and 12.7% of the population were below the poverty line, including 13.7% of those under age 18 and 16.8% of those age 65 or over.

== Communities ==
=== City ===
- Watertown (county seat)

=== Towns ===
- Florence
- Henry
- Kranzburg
- South Shore
- Wallace

=== Census-designated place ===
- Waverly

=== Unincorporated communities ===
- Appleby
- Grover
- Kampeska
- Rauville

=== Townships ===
- Dexter
- Eden
- Elmira
- Fuller
- Germantown
- Graceland
- Henry
- Kampeska
- Kranzburg
- Lake
- Leola
- Pelican
- Phipps
- Rauville
- Richland
- Sheridan
- Waverly

== Politics ==
Codington County voters have been reliably Republican for several decades. In no national election since 1976 has the county selected the Democratic Party candidate.

United States presidential election results for Codington County, South Dakota
Year	Republican		Democratic		Third party(ies)	
Year	No.	%	No.	%	No.	%
1892	882	52.16%	408	24.13%	401	23.71%
1896	1,041	57.10%	759	41.63%	23	1.26%
1900	1,225	58.28%	805	38.30%	72	3.43%
1904	1,741	72.18%	582	24.13%	89	3.69%
1908	1,618	63.30%	831	32.51%	107	4.19%
1912	0	0.00%	1,111	45.03%	1,356	54.97%
1916	1,550	51.82%	1,344	44.93%	97	3.24%
1920	2,706	59.84%	867	19.17%	949	20.99%
1924	1,862	41.38%	627	13.93%	2,011	44.69%
1928	3,762	53.08%	3,299	46.55%	26	0.37%
1932	2,538	34.32%	4,806	64.98%	52	0.70%
1936	3,005	39.44%	4,256	55.85%	359	4.71%
1940	4,320	53.83%	3,705	46.17%	0	0.00%
1944	3,348	51.76%	3,120	48.24%	0	0.00%
1948	3,349	45.01%	4,042	54.32%	50	0.67%
1952	5,750	65.91%	2,974	34.09%	0	0.00%
1956	5,150	57.72%	3,772	42.28%	0	0.00%
1960	5,309	55.23%	4,304	44.77%	0	0.00%
1964	3,593	40.16%	5,353	59.84%	0	0.00%
1968	3,929	46.49%	4,235	50.11%	288	3.41%
1972	4,936	51.61%	4,601	48.11%	27	0.28%
1976	4,504	48.89%	4,680	50.80%	29	0.31%
1980	5,903	59.09%	3,353	33.56%	734	7.35%
1984	6,108	63.11%	3,528	36.45%	42	0.43%
1988	5,050	51.99%	4,570	47.05%	94	0.97%
1992	3,943	36.03%	3,701	33.82%	3,299	30.15%
1996	4,995	45.18%	4,722	42.71%	1,338	12.10%
2000	6,718	60.32%	4,192	37.64%	228	2.05%
2004	7,778	61.00%	4,803	37.67%	170	1.33%
2008	6,374	52.31%	5,595	45.92%	216	1.77%
2012	6,696	58.10%	4,588	39.81%	240	2.08%
2016	7,764	66.54%	3,174	27.20%	731	6.26%
2020	8,958	68.06%	3,837	29.15%	366	2.78%
2024	9,349	69.20%	3,840	28.42%	321	2.38%

== Education ==
School districts include:

- Castlewood School District 28-1
- Florence School District 14-1
- Hamlin School District 28-3
- Henry School District 14-2
- Watertown School District 14-4
- Waverly School District 14-5
- Webster School District 18-5

== See also ==
- Codington County Courthouse
- National Register of Historic Places listings in Codington County, South Dakota
