= Kranzburg, South Dakota =

- Town
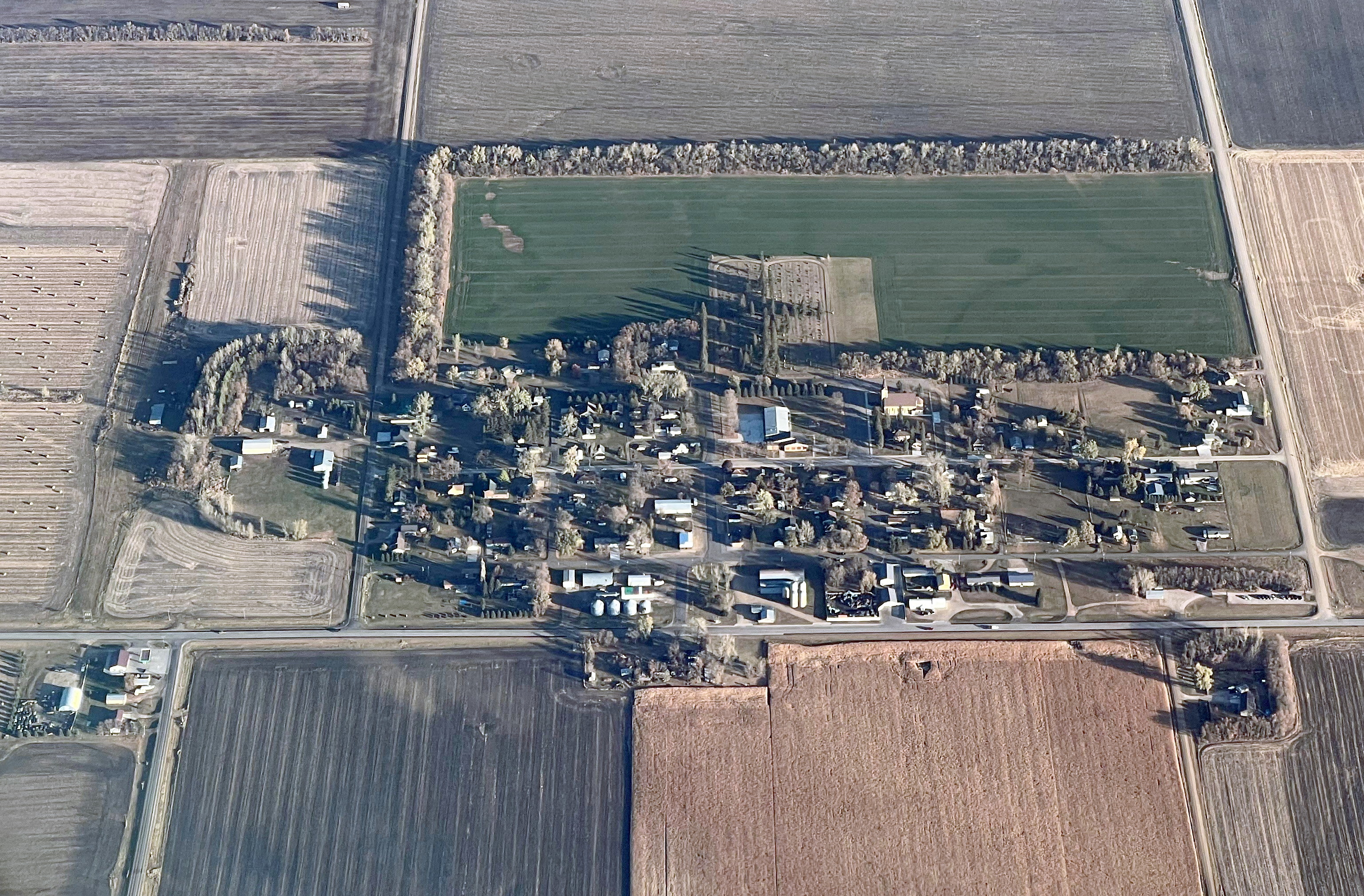
- Kranzburg, SD from the air

- Location in Codington County and the state of South Dakota
- Coordinates: 44°53′20″N 96°54′34″W
- Country: United States
- State: South Dakota
- County: Codington
- Founded: May 16, 1879

Area
  - Total: 0.76 sq mi (1.98 km^{2})
  - Land: 0.76 sq mi (1.98 km^{2})
  - Water: 0 sq mi (0.00 km^{2})
- Elevation: 1,975 ft (602 m)

Population (2020)
  - Total: 163
  - Density: 213.5/sq mi (82.42/km^{2})
- Time zone: UTC-6 (CST)
  - Summer (DST): UTC-5 (CDT)
- ZIP code: 57245
- Area code: 605
- FIPS code: 46-34340
- GNIS feature ID: 1267446

Kranzburg is a town in Codington County, South Dakota, United States. The population was 163 at the 2020 census. It is part of the Watertown, South Dakota Micropolitan Statistical Area.

== History ==
Kranzburg was platted in 1879. It was named in honor of the four Kranz brothers who settled there. All four of the Kranz brothers were immigrants from Vianden, Luxembourg. A post office has been in operation in Kranzburg since 1879.

== Geography ==
According to the United States Census Bureau, the town has a total area of 0.76 square miles (1.97 km^{2}), all land.

== Demographics ==
Historical population
Census	Pop.	Note	%±
1960	156		—
1970	143		−8.3%
1980	136		−4.9%
1990	132		−2.9%
2000	185		40.2%
2010	172		−7.0%
2020	163		−5.2%
2021 (est.)	168	▲	3.1%
U.S. Decennial Census; 2020 Census

=== 2010 census ===
As of the census of 2010, there were 172 people, 64 households, and 49 families residing in the town. The population density was 226.3 inhabitants per square mile (87.4/km^{2}). There were 70 housing units at an average density of 92.1 units per square mile (35.6 units/km^{2}). The racial makeup of the town was 99.4% White and 0.6% from other races. Hispanic or Latino of any race were 0.6% of the population.

There were 64 households, of which 31.3% had children under the age of 18 living with them, 70.3% were married couples living together, 3.1% had a female householder with no husband present, 3.1% had a male householder with no wife present, and 23.4% were non-families. 17.2% of all households were made up of individuals, and 12.5% had someone living alone who was 65 years of age or older. The average household size was 2.69 and the average family size was 3.12.

The median age in the town was 39.5 years. 25% of residents were under the age of 18; 6.5% were between the ages of 18 and 24; 26.2% were from 25 to 44; 26.8% were from 45 to 64; and 15.7% were 65 years of age or older. The gender makeup of the town was 51.2% male and 48.8% female.

=== 2000 census ===
As of the census of 2000, there were 185 people, 63 households, and 48 families residing in the town. The population density was 242.9 inhabitants per square mile (93.8/km^{2}). There were 65 housing units at an average density of 85.4 units per square mile (33.0 units/km^{2}). The racial makeup of the town was 98.38% White, 0.54% African American, 0.54% Native American, 0.54% from other races. Hispanic or Latino of any race were 1.08% of the population.

There were 63 households, out of which 49.2% had children under the age of 18 living with them, 61.9% were married couples living together, 7.9% had a female householder with no husband present, and 23.8% were non-families. 22.2% of all households were made up of individuals, and 6.3% had someone living alone who was 65 years of age or older. The average household size was 2.94 and the average family size was 3.48.

In the town, the population was spread out, with 37.8% under the age of 18, 6.5% from 18 to 24, 29.7% from 25 to 44, 16.2% from 45 to 64, and 9.7% who were 65 years of age or older. The median age was 29 years. For every 100 females, there were 107.9 males. For every 100 females age 18 and over, there were 91.7 males.

The median income for a household in the town was $45,125, and the median income for a family was $46,406. Males had a median income of $30,125 versus $21,250 for females. The per capita income for the town was $13,258. About 6.7% of families and 15.1% of the population were below the poverty line, including 21.5% of those under the age of eighteen and none of those 65 or over.

== Education ==
It is in the Watertown School District 14-4.

Holy Rosary Catholic School was the only school in operation in Kranzburg, until closing its doors in 2013. The private grade school served the Kranzburg community and surrounding area for over 70 years, with preschool, kindergarten, and first through sixth grades offered to students. The building is still currently in use, with religious education classes taking place every week during the regular school year. The attached parish hall is also used for private and parish sponsored events, from dinners to the annual bazaar every September. A new playground was installed on the grounds in 2007 as well.

== Arts and culture ==
Kranzburg is the annual host of the Kranzburg Fourth of July parade, where visitors have come from far and wide to celebrate the 4th of July for over 60 years. The small town of 172 people boasts a staggering number of over 10,000 people every year, with distinguished visitors participating in the parade, such as U.S. Senator John Thune and Governor Kristi Noem.

== Transportation ==
U.S. Route 212 runs east to west on the south end of Kranzburg, with Minneapolis/St. Paul being three and a half hours to the east, and the city of Watertown eight miles to the west. Access to Interstate 29 is also located eight miles to the west and 12 miles to the south.

Watertown Regional Airport is located 14 miles to the west of Kranzburg, providing daily air service to Chicago and Denver.
