= Florence, South Dakota =

- Town
- Location in Codington County and the state of South Dakota
- Coordinates: 45°03′17″N 97°19′35″W
- Country: United States
- State: South Dakota
- County: Codington
- Incorporated: 1907

Area
  - Total: 0.69 sq mi (1.79 km^{2})
  - Land: 0.69 sq mi (1.79 km^{2})
  - Water: 0 sq mi (0.00 km^{2})
- Elevation: 1,772 ft (540 m)

Population (2020)
  - Total: 337
  - Density: 486.3/sq mi (187.75/km^{2})
- Time zone: UTC−6 (CST)
  - Summer (DST): UTC−5 (CDT)
- ZIP Code: 57235
- Area code: 605
- FIPS code: 46-21820
- GNIS feature ID: 1267392

Florence is a town in northwestern Codington County, South Dakota, United States. It is part of the Watertown, South Dakota Micropolitan Statistical Area. The population was 337 at the 2020 census.

Florence was named for a lady acquaintance of a railroad employee.

== Geography ==
According to the United States Census Bureau, the town has a total area of 0.69 square miles (1.79 km^{2}), all land.

== Demographics ==
Historical population
Census	Pop.	Note	%±
1910	270		—
1920	290		7.4%
1930	298		2.8%
1940	254		−14.8%
1950	226		−11.0%
1960	216		−4.4%
1970	175		−19.0%
1980	190		8.6%
1990	192		1.1%
2000	299		55.7%
2010	374		25.1%
2020	337		−9.9%
2021 (est.)	329	▼	−2.4%
U.S. Decennial Census; 2020 Census

=== 2010 census ===
As of the census of 2010, there were 374 people, 146 households, and 95 families residing in the town. The population density was 542.0 inhabitants per square mile (209.3/km^{2}). There were 159 housing units at an average density of 230.4 per square mile (89.0/km^{2}). The racial makeup of the town was 97.1% White, 1.9% Native American, and 1.1% from two or more races.

There were 146 households, of which 36.3% had children under the age of 18 living with them, 55.5% were married couples living together, 4.8% had a female householder with no husband present, 4.8% had a male householder with no wife present, and 34.9% were non-families. 33.6% of all households were made up of individuals, and 17.8% had someone living alone who was 65 years of age or older. The average household size was 2.56 and the average family size was 3.28.

The median age in the town was 34.4 years. Of residents, 31.6% were under the age of 18; 4.7% were between the ages of 18 and 24; 26.4% were from 25 to 44; 20.5% were from 45 to 64; and 16.6% were 65 years of age or older. The gender makeup of the town was 51.1% male and 48.9% female.

=== 2000 census ===
As of the census of 2000, there were 299 people, 108 households, and 80 families residing in the town. The population density was 453.3 inhabitants per square mile (175.0/km^{2}). There were 112 housing units at an average density of 169.8 per square mile (65.6/km^{2}). The racial makeup of the town was 95.65% White, 0.33% African American, 1.67% Native American, 0.33% Asian, and 2.01% from two or more races, also known as mulattoes.

There were 108 households, out of which 42.6% had children under the age of 18 living with them, 62.0% were married couples living together, 6.5% had a female householder with no husband present, and 25.9% were non-families. Of all households, 22.2% were made up of individuals, and 10.2% had someone living alone who was 65 years of age or older. The average household size was 2.77 and the average family size was 3.29.

In the town, the population was spread out, with 34.8% under the age of 18, 6.0% from 18 to 24, 29.4% from 25 to 44, 19.1% from 45 to 64, and 10.7% who were 65 years of age or older. The median age was 32 years. For every 100 females, there were 85.7 males. For every 100 females age 18 and over, there were 93.1 males.

The median income for a household in the town was $39,375, and the median income for a family was $38,750. Males had a median income of $30,972 versus $16,563 for females. The per capita income for the town was $15,003. About 2.4% of families and 5.8% of the population were below the poverty line, including 4.0% of those under the age of eighteen and 8.0% of those 65 or over.

== Education ==
It is in the Florence School District 14-1.

== See also ==
- List of towns in South Dakota
