= 2013 F1 Powerboat World Championship =

2013 F1 Powerboat World Championship
Previous:	2012	Next:	2014

The 2013 UIM F1 H_{2}O World Championship was the 30th season of Formula 1 Powerboat racing. For the first time in the championship's history, there was an event held in South America, with the first race of the year taking place in Brasília on 1 and 2 June. In addition, the series' 250th race since it began in 1981 took place on 2 October at the Grand Prix of China in Liuzhou.

Alex Carella, driving for the Qatar Team, successfully defended his world championship for the second year in a row, ensuring he became only the second driver in the history of the championship to win three consecutive world titles, after Guido Cappellini.

== Teams and drivers ==
Team	Hull	Engine	No.	Race drivers	Rounds
Qatar Team	DAC	Mercury 2.5 V6	1	(Italy) Alex Carella	All
Qatar Team	DAC	Mercury 2.5 V6	2	(United States) Shaun Torrente	All
(United Arab Emirates) Team Nautica	BaBa	Mercury 2.5 V6	3	(Switzerland) Rinaldo Osculati	All
(United Arab Emirates) Team Nautica	BaBa	Mercury 2.5 V6	4	(Norway) Marit Strømøy	All
(United Arab Emirates) Team Abu Dhabi	BaBa	Mercury 2.5 V6	5	(United Arab Emirates) Thani Al Qamzi	All
(United Arab Emirates) Team Abu Dhabi	BaBa	Mercury 2.5 V6	6	(United Arab Emirates) Ahmed Al Hameli	All
CTIC China Team	Moore	Mercury 2.5 V6	7	(France) Philippe Chiappe	All
CTIC China Team	DAC	Mercury 2.5 V6	8	(China) Xiong Ziwei	All
(Portugal) F1 Atlantic Team/Interpass/GC	DAC	Mercury 2.5 V6	9	(Kuwait) Youssef Al Rubayan	All
(Portugal) F1 Atlantic Team/Interpass/GC	BaBa	Mercury 2.5 V6	10	(Portugal) Duarte Benavente	All
(Italy) Mad Croc BaBa Racing Team	BaBa	Mercury 2.5 V6	11	(Finland) Sami Seliö	All
(Italy) Mad Croc BaBa Racing Team	BaBa	Mercury 2.5 V6	12	(Finland) Filip Roms	All
Team Azerbaijan	Molgaard	Mercury 2.5 V6	14	(Sweden) Jonas Andersson	All
Team Azerbaijan	Molgaard	Mercury 2.5 V6	15	(Norway) Pal Virik Nilsen	1
Team Azerbaijan	Molgaard	Mercury 2.5 V6	15	(Sweden) Tommy Wahlsten	2, 6
Team Azerbaijan	DAC	Mercury 2.5 V6	15	(United States) Terry Rinker	3–5
Team Azerbaijan	Molgaard	Mercury 2.5 V6	16	(Brazil) Paul Gaiser	1
(Italy) Singha F1 Racing Team	BaBa	Mercury 2.5 V6	18	(Poland) Bartek Marszalek	2–4
(Italy) Singha F1 Racing Team	BaBa	Mercury 2.5 V6	18	(Poland) Bartek Marszalek	5–6
(Italy) Singha F1 Racing Team	DAC	Mercury 2.5 V6	23	(Italy) Valerio Lagiannella	1–2, 4–5
(Italy) Singha F1 Racing Team	DAC	Mercury 2.5 V6	23	(Australia) Rhys Coles	3
(Italy) Singha F1 Racing Team	Blaze	Mercury 2.5 V6	24	(Italy) Francesco Cantando	1–4, 6
(South Africa) Caudwell Racing	Caudwell	Caudwell 3.5 V6	25	(South Africa) Paul Shepard	4–6
(South Africa) Caudwell Racing	Caudwell	Caudwell 3.5 V6	26	(Italy) Ivan Brigada	4–6

Key
Regular boat/driver
Boat ineligible for team points

=== Team changes ===
All nine full-time teams from 2012 continued into the 2013 season, although Team Sweden revisited a title sponsorship agreement with the country of Azerbaijan which saw the outfit rebranded to Team Azerbaijan, a partnership last formed back in 2010. None of the part-time teams that participated in 2012 were present for the opening round in Brazil, however there was speculation that Dragon Racing would at some point rejoin the series, as would Jay Price, the 2008 champion who drove for the other part-time team in 2012, Skydive Dubai. Neither of these teams ultimately entered the championship however.

Caudwell Racing were forced to miss the first race of the year in Brazil due to their new boats not being ready in time. After it was initially believed that they would join the rest of the field at the second race of the season in Ukraine, as in Brazil Caudwell were not present. Shortly before the third race at Liuzhou, the South African team made the announcement that they would be returning to the fold in Qatar for the fourth race, citing "unprecedented shipping challenges" for their delay. The delay however allowed the team to design an all-new hull and make major refinements to their revolutionary four-stroke engine.

=== Driver changes ===
Following his two race ban at the end of the 2012 season, Shaun Torrente returned to the Qatar Team to partner reigning double world champion Alex Carella. Neither Terry Rinker who filled in for Torrente, nor Khalid Al Shamlan, the Qatari who raced for the team for one race in 2012, were announced as drivers.

Ahmed Al Hameli was initially expected to miss out on racing in 2013 following surgery on a brain tumour mid-way through the 2012 season which forced his withdrawal, with Rashed Al Tayer, rather than Majed Al Mansoori who had replaced Al Hameli in 2012, taking his place at Team Abu Dhabi. However just a week prior to the first race of the year in Brazil, Al Hameli announced that he had been cleared by doctors to participate in the championship, completing a remarkable recovery that would allow him to challenge for a championship which he had been favourite to win prior to his operation in 2012.

After a promising debut in the final two races of 2012, Chinese driver Xiong Ziwei was handed a full-time drive alongside regular Team CTIC China driver Philippe Chiappe, following the retirement of veteran Russian driver Stanislav Kurtsenovskiy. At the F1 Atlantic Team, Phillipe Toure didn't return for 2013, ensuring that the outfit would run with just two full-time boats for the year, with Duarte Benavente and Youssef Al Rubayan continuing on.

Jonas Andersson continued at the renamed Team Azerbaijan for 2013, and after having a number of different drivers in the team's second boat in 2012, announced that Norwegian veteran Pal Virik Nilsen would make his debut in F1 at Brazil alongside the Swede. Brazilian Paul Gaiser also entered for Team Azerbaijan in a third boat at his home event having last raced in F1 back in 2001, 12 years previously. Prior to the Brazilian race, Gaiser announced that it would be his last and would retire from racing afterwards, describing F1 as "a sport for the young". Gaiser was forced to withdraw from the Brazilian event however after injuring his wrist, and subsequently reversed his decision to retire, indicating that he would return to the boat for the next race in Ukraine. This failed to materialise though, and alongside Andersson in Kyiv was fellow Swede Tommy Wahlsten, replacing Nilsen. But by China, Andersson had a third driver in as many races in his second boat, with recently crowned 2013 USF1 champion Terry Rinker taking the drive as the American returned to the series after a brief cameo in 2012. Rinker drove the second Azerbaijan boat until the final race of the year where Wahlsten found himself back in as number two to see out the year.

Both Francesco Cantando and Valerio Lagiannella stayed on at the Singha F1 Racing Team, and would be joined in a third boat by Polish driver Bartek Marszalek at the second round in Ukraine. Joining Cantando and Marszalek in China was Rhys Coles, the Australian driving Lagiannella's #23 DAC boat having last made an appearance in the series in 2012 in a one-off drive for Team Sweden at the Grand Prix of Qatar. Prior to his involvement with Singha, Marszalek had last raced in the series in 2011, competing in five races in a third boat for Team Nautica. Nautica were one of two teams who had unchanged line-ups for 2013, along with Mad Croc Baba Racing. Caudwell Racing retained Ivan Brigada when they eventually joined the series at the fourth race in Qatar, with South African Paul Shepard making his debut alongside the Italian.

== Season calendar ==
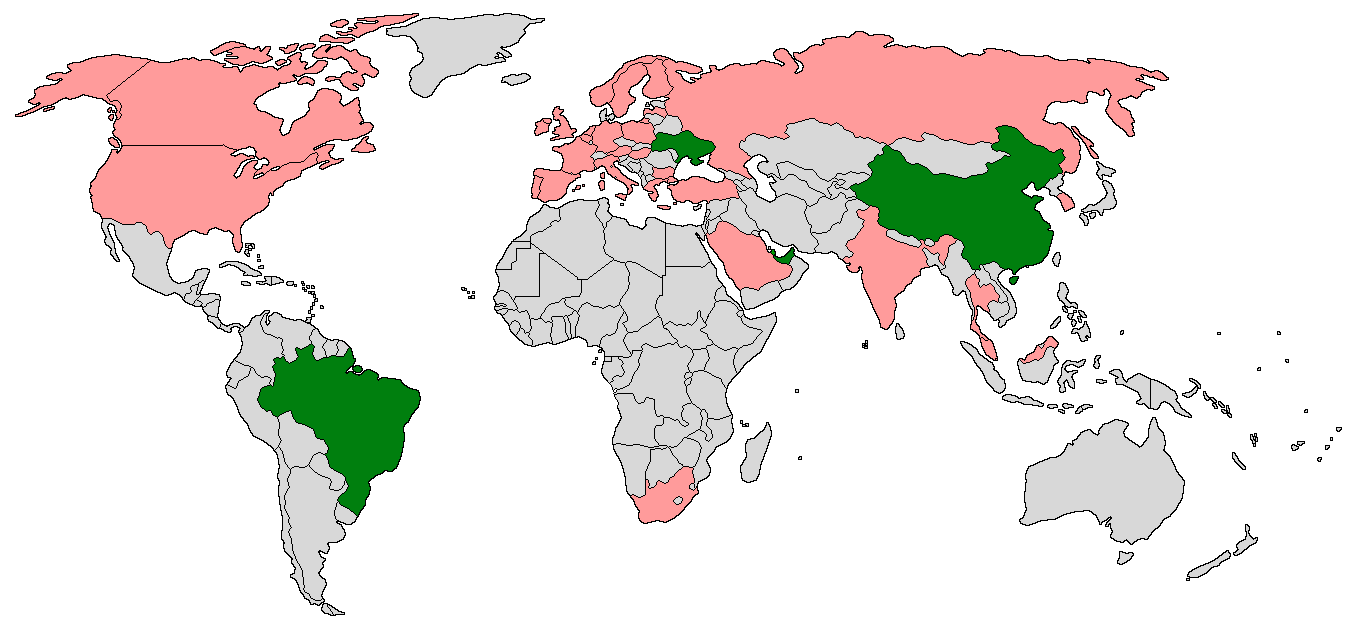
Countries that hosted F1 Powerboat races in 2013, shown in green. Former host nations are shown in pink.

An initial calendar of eight races was released by the UIM at the beginning of 2013, including Brazil, and thus South America for the first time in the history of the F1 Powerboat World Championship. However the Grand Prix of Tatarstan, due to be the third race of the year and held at the end of August, was cancelled on 29 April, with the Russian authorities in Kazan, where the race was to be held, hoping to reintroduce the event for 2014. This meant the calendar dropped to seven races for the 2013 season, and was the first season that an event wasn't held in Russia since 2007. As part of the seven race calendar, there were to be two back-to-back races in China, and whilst Liuzhou was announced as the second of the two races upon the calendar's release, it took some time for a first race to be confirmed. Eventually Shanghai was announced as the venue at the beginning of May, and would have been the 250th race in the championship's history. However less than three months later towards the end of July, the event was pulled from the calendar, leaving six races to make up the schedule, and Liuzhou to take the title of the historic 250th GP.

Round	Race title	Date	Circuit location	Race winner	Hull/Engine
1	1st Grand Prix of Brazil	2 June	Brasília	(Finland) Sami Seliö	BaBa/Mercury
2	3rd Grand Prix of Ukraine	27 July	Vyshhorod	(France) Philippe Chiappe	Moore/Mercury
3	17th Grand Prix of China	2 October	Liuzhou	(Italy) Alex Carella	DAC/Mercury
4	10th Grand Prix of Qatar	23 November	Doha	(United States) Shaun Torrente	DAC/Mercury
5	(United Arab Emirates) 21st Grand Prix of Abu Dhabi	29 November	Abu Dhabi	(Finland) Sami Seliö	BaBa/Mercury
6	(United Arab Emirates) 14th Grand Prix of Sharjah	13 December	Sharjah	(Italy) Alex Carella	DAC/Mercury

== Results and standings ==
Points were awarded to the top 10 classified finishers. A maximum of two boats per team were eligible for points in the teams' championship.

Position	**1st**	**2nd**	**3rd**	**4th**	**5th**	**6th**	**7th**	**8th**	**9th**	**10th**
Points	20	15	12	9	7	5	4	3	2	1

=== Drivers standings ===
Pos	Driver	BRA (Brazil)	UKR (Ukraine)	CHN (China)	QAT (Qatar)	ABU (United Arab Emirates)	SHA (United Arab Emirates)	Points
1	(Italy) Alex Carella	3	3	**1**	**7**	3	**1**	80
2	(United States) Shaun Torrente	2	2	6	1	5	3	74
3	(France) Philippe Chiappe	5	1	3	DSQ	2	2	69
4	(Finland) Sami Seliö	**1**	**4**	2	Ret	**1**	Ret	64
5	(Kuwait) Youssef Al Rubayan	9	8	7	3	6	8	29
6	(United Arab Emirates) Thani Al Qamzi	4	7	4	Ret	Ret	5	29
7	(Sweden) Jonas Andersson	Ret	6	5	2	Ret	Ret	27
8	(Norway) Marit Strømøy	10	10	Ret	5	4	Ret	18
9	(Italy) Francesco Cantando	6	5	Ret	Ret		6	17
10	(United Arab Emirates) Ahmed Al Hameli	7	9	10	Ret	Ret	4	16
11	(Portugal) Duarte Benavente	11	Ret	Ret	4	DNS	9	11
12	(Finland) Filip Roms	Ret	12	9	6	8	DNS	10
13	(Poland) Bartek Marszalek		Ret	8	8	11	7	10
14	(Italy) Valerio Lagiannella	8	11		Ret	9		5
15	(United States) Terry Rinker			Ret	Ret	7		4
16	(Switzerland) Rinaldo Osculati	13	15	Ret	9	Ret	Ret	2
17	(China) Xiong Ziwei	Ret	13	DNS	11	Ret	10	1
18	(Italy) Ivan Brigada				Ret	10	Ret	1
19	(Norway) Pal Virik Nilsen	12						0
	(South Africa) Paul Shepard				Ret	DNS	DNS	0
	(Sweden) Tommy Wahlsten		Ret				DNS	0
	(Australia) Rhys Coles			DNS				–
	(Brazil) Paul Gaiser	WD						–

Key
Colour	Result
Gold	Winner
Silver	Second place
Bronze	Third place
Green	Other points position
Blue	Other classified position
Blue	Not classified, finished (NC)
Purple	Not classified, retired (Ret)
Red	Did not qualify (DNQ)
Red	Did not pre-qualify (DNPQ)
Black	Disqualified (DSQ)
White	Did not start (DNS)
White	Race cancelled (C)
Blank	Did not practice (DNP)
Blank	Excluded (EX)
Blank	Did not arrive (DNA)
Blank	Withdrawn (WD)
Blank	Did not enter (cell empty)
Text formatting	Meaning
**Bold**	Pole position
Italics	Fastest lap

=== Teams standings ===
Only boats with results eligible for points counting towards the teams' championship are shown here.

Pos	Team	Boat No.	BRA (Brazil)	UKR (Ukraine)	CHN (China)	QAT (Qatar)	ABU (United Arab Emirates)	SHA (United Arab Emirates)	Points
1	Qatar Team	1	3	3	**1**	**7**	3	**1**	154
1	Qatar Team	2	2	2	6	1	5	3	154
2	(Italy) Mad Croc BaBa Racing Team	11	**1**	**4**	2	Ret	**1**	Ret	74
2	(Italy) Mad Croc BaBa Racing Team	12	Ret	12	9	6	8	DNS	74
3	CTIC China Team	7	5	1	3	DSQ	2	2	70
3	CTIC China Team	8	Ret	13	DNS	11	Ret	10	70
4	(United Arab Emirates) Team Abu Dhabi	5	4	7	4	Ret	Ret	5	45
4	(United Arab Emirates) Team Abu Dhabi	6	7	9	10	Ret	Ret	4	45
5	(Portugal) F1 Atlantic Team/Interpass/GC	9	9	8	7	3	6	8	40
5	(Portugal) F1 Atlantic Team/Interpass/GC	10	11	Ret	Ret	4	DNS	9	40
6	Team Azerbaijan	14	Ret	6	5	2	Ret	Ret	31
6	Team Azerbaijan	15	12	Ret	Ret	Ret	7	DNS	31
7	(Italy) Singha F1 Racing Team	18					11	7	26
7	(Italy) Singha F1 Racing Team	23	8	11	DNS	Ret	9		26
7	(Italy) Singha F1 Racing Team	24	6	5	Ret	Ret		6	26
8	(United Arab Emirates) Team Nautica	3	13	15	Ret	9	Ret	Ret	20
8	(United Arab Emirates) Team Nautica	4	10	10	Ret	5	4	Ret	20
9	(South Africa) Caudwell Racing	25				Ret	DNS	DNS	1
9	(South Africa) Caudwell Racing	26				Ret	10	Ret	1

Key
Colour	Result
Gold	Winner
Silver	Second place
Bronze	Third place
Green	Other points position
Blue	Other classified position
Blue	Not classified, finished (NC)
Purple	Not classified, retired (Ret)
Red	Did not qualify (DNQ)
Red	Did not pre-qualify (DNPQ)
Black	Disqualified (DSQ)
White	Did not start (DNS)
White	Race cancelled (C)
Blank	Did not practice (DNP)
Blank	Excluded (EX)
Blank	Did not arrive (DNA)
Blank	Withdrawn (WD)
Blank	Did not enter (cell empty)
Text formatting	Meaning
**Bold**	Pole position
Italics	Fastest lap
