= Philippe Chiappe =

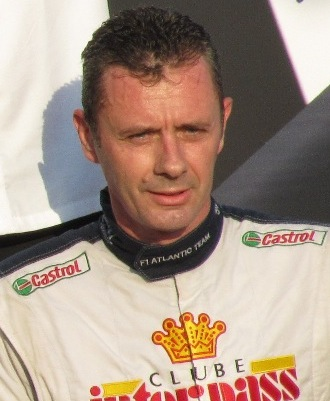
- Philippe Chiappe in 2009
- Nationality: French
- Born: November 21, 1963 (age 62) Caudebec-en-Caux, France

F1 Powerboat World Championship career
- Debut season: 2001
- Current team: CTIC F1 Shenzhen China Team
- Former teams: F1 Atlantic Team
- Starts: 107
- Wins: 7
- Poles: 5
- Fastest laps: 9
- Best finish: 1st in 2014, 2015, 2016

Previous series
- 2001-02, 2006 1998-00: French Vitesse S3000; French S850

Championship titles
- 2014-2016 2006: F1 Powerboat World Championship; French Vitesse S3000

Philippe Chiappe (born 21 November 1963) is a French driver in the Formula 1 Powerboat World Championship, currently competing for the CTIC F1 Shenzhen China Team. A three-time champion, he won his first title in 2014, becoming the first Frenchman to do so, and then retained the championship in the following two seasons in 2015 and 2016. Chiappe is one of the longest-serving current drivers in the field, having made his debut in 2001 and entered his first full season in 2003. He started his 100th race at the Grand Prix of Sharjah in 2015.

Chiappe has spent all bar three of his seasons in F1 with Philippe Dessertenne's team which has undergone several name changes over the years and most recently has been heavily supported by Chinese sponsors. As one of only four drivers to win back-to-back championships, Chiappe has done so in a French-based team, driving a French Moore boat. His success has improved the sport's exposure in his own country and after his first title, France re-appeared on the series' calendar with a race of its own after an eight-year hiatus.

Away from Formula 1, Chiappe has also had success in endurance powerboat racing, having won multiple classes at the 24 Hours of Rouen event. He began his career in the French S850 class where he competed from 1998 to 2000 and afterwards moved to the French Vitesse S3000 class for 2001. Chiappe stayed for 2002 before making the step-up to F1 full-time in 2003, but returned to the S3000 class in 2006 and won the championship.

== Racing record ==
=== Complete Formula 1 Powerboat World Championship results ===
| Year | Entrant | Hull | Engine | 1 | 2 | 3 | 4 | 5 | 6 | 7 | 8 | 9 | 10 | 11 | 12 | 13 | 14 | 15 | 16 | WDC | Points |
|---|---|---|---|---|---|---|---|---|---|---|---|---|---|---|---|---|---|---|---|---|---|
| 2001 | Team Fuchs F1 | Seebold | Mercury 2.5l | MAL | POR | HUN | LAT | ITA | ITA | GER | IRE | SHA; DNS | ABU; Ret | | | | | | | – | 0 |
| 2002 | Charente Maritime EIGSI Team | Seebold | Mercury 2.5l | POR | ITA | FIN | HUN | ITA | GER | MAL | IRE | SHA; 16 | ABU; 16 | | | | | | | 28th | 0 |
| 2003 | F1 Ligier Sports | Moore | Mercury 2.5l | POR; 12 | FIN; 12 | ITA; 13 | GER; Ret | MAL; 14 | SIN; Ret | SHA; 12 | ABU; 14 | | | | | | | | | 24th | 0 |
| 2004 | F1 Ligier Sports | Moore | Mercury 2.5l | IND; 13 | KSA; Ret | POR; 14 | ITA; 12 | ITA; 13 | CHN; 11 | SIN; 8 | MAL; 10 | KOR; 16 | SHA; 9 | | | | | | | 16th | 6 |
| 2005 | F1 Ligier Sports / Charente-Maritime | Moore | Mercury 2.5l | POR; 13 | ITA; 12 | SIN; Ret | QAT; DNS | ABU; Ret | SHA; 11 | | | | | | | | | | | 23rd | 0 |
| 2006 | CTIC China Team Charente Maritime | BaBa | Mercury 2.5l | QAT; 8 | POR; 8 | ITA; 11 | CHN; 7 | ABU; 4 | SHA; DNS | | | | | | | | | | | 11th | 19 |
| 2007 | Atlantic Team | BaBa | Mercury 2.5l | POR; 8 | FRA; 5 | CHN; Ret | CHN; Ret | QAT; 4 | QAT; 6 | ABU; Ret | SHA; 6 | | | | | | | | | 8th | 29 |
| 2008 | F1 Atlantic Team | BaBa | Mercury 2.5l | QAT; 7 | POR; 10 | FIN; 5 | RUS; 8 | CHN; 4 | CHN; 6 | ABU; 7 | SHA; 5 | | | | | | | | | 7th | 40 |
| 2009 | F1 Atlantic Team | Moore | Mercury 2.5l | POR; 1 Ret | POR; 2; 12 | FIN; 1; 11 | FIN; 2; 5 | RUS; 1; 3 | RUS; 2; 7 | CHN; 1; 4 | CHN; 2; 10 | CHN; 1 Ret | CHN; 2; 3 | QAT; 1; 4 | QAT; 2; 3 | ABU; 1; 7 | ABU; 2; 3 | SHA; 1 Ret | SHA; 2 DNS | 8th | 82 |
| 2010 | CTIC China Team | Moore | Mercury 2.5l | POR; Ret | RUS; Ret | CHN; 9 | CHN; Ret | CHN; 2 | QAT; 9 | ABU; 5 | SHA; Ret | | | | | | | | | 8th | 26 |
| 2011 | CTIC China Team | Moore | Mercury 2.5l | QAT; 3 | POR; 9 | TAR; 5 | UKR; 9 | CHN; 3 | ABU; Ret | SHA; 3 | | | | | | | | | | 5th | 47 |
| 2012 | CTIC China Team | Moore | Mercury 2.5l | QAT; 2 | TAR; 3 | UKR; 4 | CHN; 3 | ABU; 4 | SHA; 6 | | | | | | | | | | | 2nd | 62 |
| 2013 | CTIC China Team | Moore | Mercury 2.5l | BRA; 5 | UKR; 1 | CHN; 3 | QAT; DSQ | ABU; 2 | SHA; 2 | | | | | | | | | | | 3rd | 69 |
| 2014 | CTIC China Team | Moore | Mercury 2.5l | QAT; 2 | CHN; Ret | MID; 2 | ABU; 1 | SHA; 1 | | | | | | | | | | | | 1st | 70 |
| 2015 | CTIC China Team | Moore | Mercury 2.5l | QAT; 2 | FRA; Ret | POR; 1 | CHN; 1 | ABU; 2 | SHA; Ret | | | | | | | | | | | 1st | 70 |
| 2016 | CTIC F1 Shenzhen China Team | Moore | Mercury 2.5l | DUB; 1 | FRA; Ret | POR; 1 | CHN; 3 | CHN; 2 | ABU; 2 | SHA; 2 | | | | | | | | | | 1st | 97 |

* Season still in progress.
