= John Hill (boat racer) =

British powerboat racer

- Nationality: British
- Born: John Peter Hill; 18 November 1933 Cheltenham, Gloucestershire, England
- Died: 16 April 1993 (aged 59) Abu Dhabi, United Arab Emirates

F1 Powerboat World Championship
- Best finish: 1st in 1990

Championship titles
- 1984, 1985 1990: Formula Grand Prix; F1 Powerboat World Championship

John Peter Hill (18 November 1933 – 16 April 1993) was a British powerboat racer. Hill began his boating career in 1960. In 1990, he won the F1 Powerboat World Championship.
