= Formula 1 Powerboat World Championship =

International motorboat racing competition for powerboats

- Category: Catamaran, single-engined, single-seater
- Country: International
- Inaugural season: 1981
- Drivers: 23 (2025)
- Teams: 10 (2025)
- Constructors: BaBa · Blaze · DAC · Dragon · Molgaard · Moore
- Engine suppliers: Mercury Marine
- Drivers' champion: (United States) Shaun Torrente (2025) (Victory Team)
- Teams' champion: Victory Team
- Official website: f1h2o.com

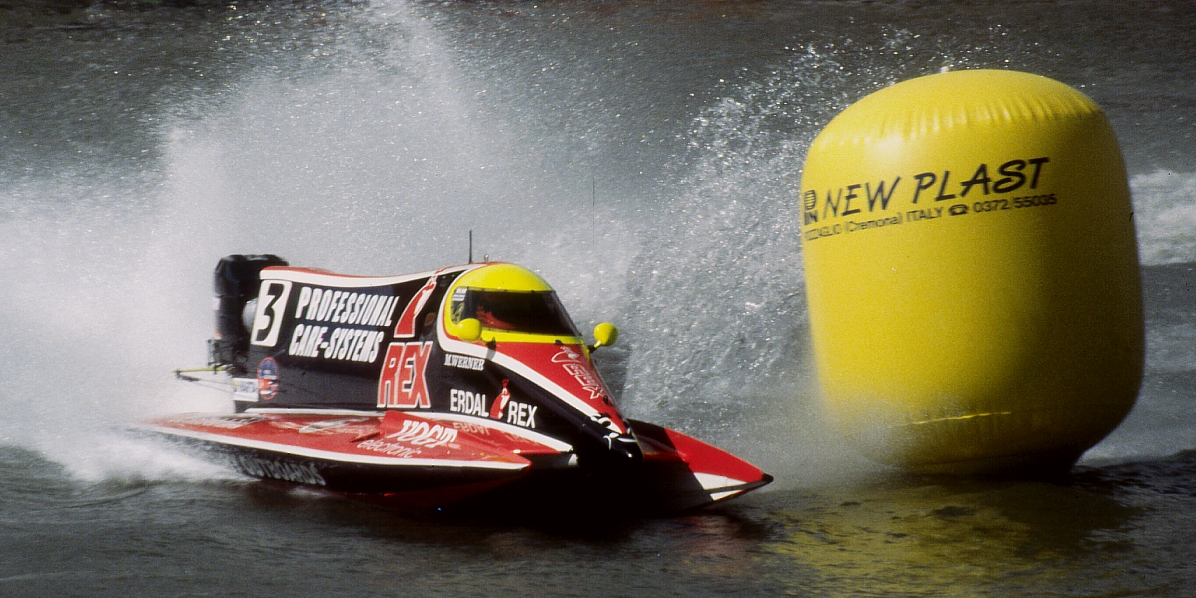
An F1 powerboat rounding a buoy

The Formula 1 Powerboat World Championship (also F1) is an international motorboat racing competition for powerboats organised by the Union Internationale Motonautique (UIM) and promoted by H2O Racing, hence it often being referred to as F1H2O. It is the highest class of inshore powerboat racing in the world, and as such, with it sharing the title of F1, is similar to Formula One car racing. Each race lasts approximately 45 minutes following a circuit marked out in a selected stretch of water, usually a lake, river, dock, or sheltered bay.

Qualifying periods decide the formation of the grid, and timing equipment records the performance of competitors to decide the final classification and allocation of championship points.

== History ==
The concept of a single unified championship for inshore powerboats had been conceived three years previously in 1978 when David Parkinson, an experienced PR manager, was offered the support of Mercury Marine, one of his clients, if he could establish such a series. The concept became the Canon Trophy, sponsored by another of Parkinson's clients, Canon Inc.

A steady escalation in engine development between Mercury and arch-rival OMC was already underway as the Canon Trophy was formed, and this arms race ultimately resulted in massively powerful 3.5-litre (210 in^{3}) V8 engines being used and led to the creation of the OZ class. Each manufacturer offered as many as half a dozen drivers with a free supply of these OZ class engines in a bid to succeed. The OZ engines differed from the ON class which was centred around a standard 2-litre capacity and consequently OZ machines, with their superior power, swept all before them. Matters came to a head when, in an attempt to extract an even greater advantage, Renato Molinari turned up with two engines on the back of his boat at the Italian Grand Prix. A petition was signed by 28 drivers in 1980 to outlaw the OZ boats and the Formula ON Drivers Association (FONDA) was born. Mercury withdrew their T4 engine and the split was confirmed. OZ and ON classes would have their own championships in 1981.

Somewhat understandably, both championships attempted to use the title of Formula 1 to market themselves as the pinnacle of powerboat racing. For much of 1981 however it was largely irrelevant. John Player had chosen to support the OMC-powered OZ championship, giving it not only an advantage in speed and technology, but also marketing. The championship was still in its early stages with a small grid, but FONDA's ON class was not much better either and was effectively the remains of the Canon Trophy. Journalists of the period continued to use the familiar terms of ON and OZ to avoid confusion, and it was only when the UIM stepped in to sort out the mess that resulted in the OZ class being awarded Formula 1 status, with the ON class given the consolation title of "World Grand Prix". Thus, with the backing of the drivers' association behind it, the FONDA World Grand Prix Series entered into a period of being overshadowed by its bigger, faster brother, the Formula 1 World Series.

By bringing together the financial support and marketing ability of John Player Special, as well as the clarity and consistency of a championship with an established event structure, one which focused on sprint races rather than a mixture that included endurance races in previous years, the category allowed for a relatively stable environment in which the top powerboat teams and drivers could compete. A fixed points system made comprehension easy for spectators, with it matching its motor racing equivalent with 9, 6, 4, 3, 2, and finally 1 point on offer for the top six finishers.

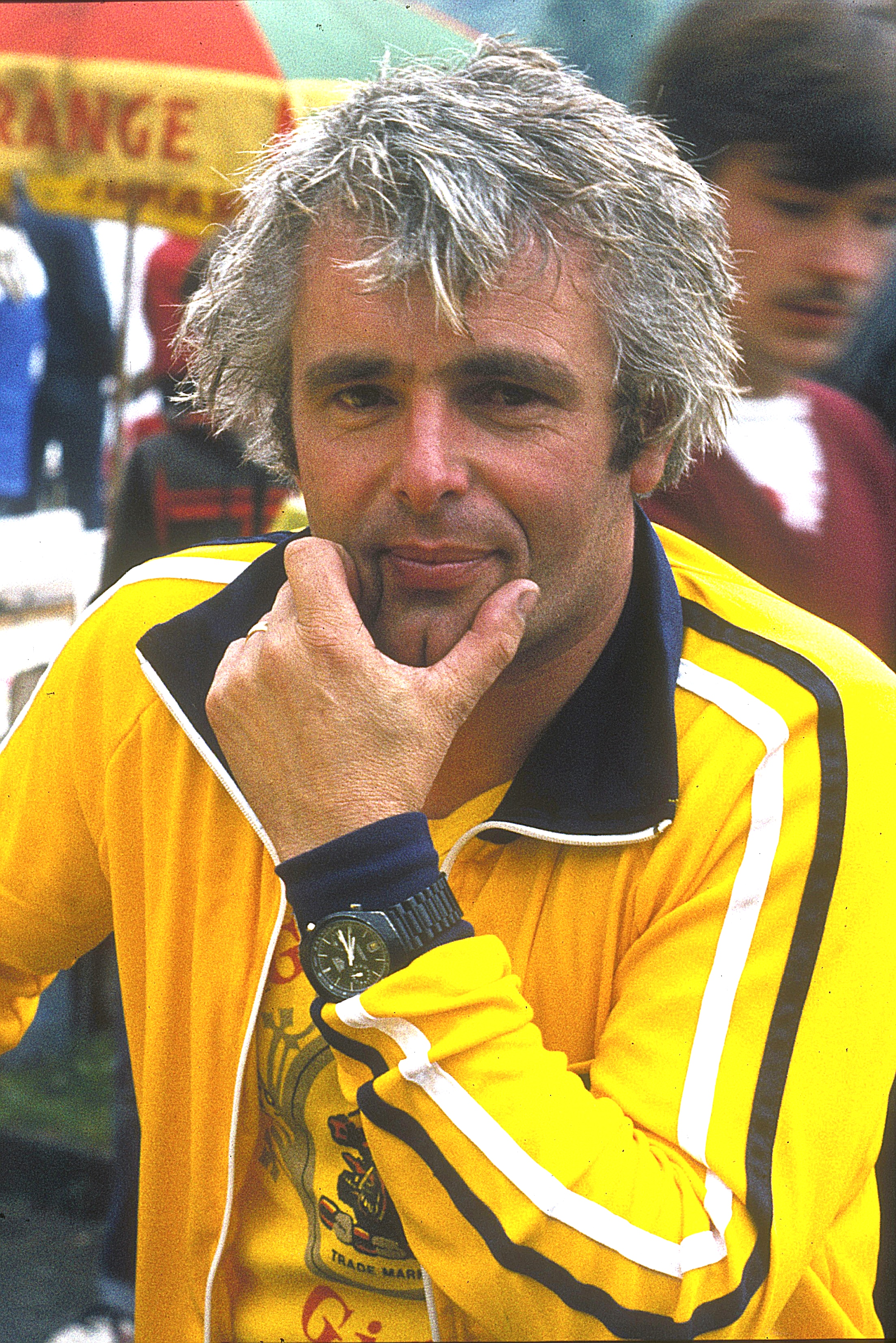
Roger Jenkins in 1981.

Safety was always looming large in the background of the F1 series. The ever-increasing speeds of the 3.5-litre V8s, as OMC continued to refine them, meant that surviving a 'big one' was becoming less and less likely. In 1984, matters reached a tragic conclusion when Tom Percival was the last of four drivers to lose their lives in the space of a matter of months. He hit the rear of Italian driver Fabrizio Bocca's Castrol sponsored Molinari boat and flew up the river Meuse bank coming to rest just before the main motorway through Liege. Cees van der Velden pulled his three-boat Benson & Hedges-backed team from the final three races of the season, and Carlsberg cancelled their partnership with Roger Jenkins, having told the 1982 champion, "another death or serious injury, and they were out". OMC were able to pull together a depleted field to see out the season, but the writing was on the wall. It was the beginning of the end for Formula 1 as the OZ class.

Keen to keep the championship running however, OMC gave the F1 World Series a facelift. With Benson & Hedges vacating the series' title sponsorship, in came Champion to create the Champion Spark Plug F1 World Series, and a new Belgian promoter, Pro One, was tasked with turning the series around. Prize money was significantly increased to attract drivers and a greater presence in the United States was sought. Following the trends in hydroplanes with seat belts and safety cells, boat designer Chris Hodges introduced the first iteration of his safety cell which paved the way for a revolution in boat safety and Bob Spalding won the title driving for the Percival Hodges team. On the outside, it appeared as if Formula 1 was set for a new period of growth, until OMC uncovered the level of spending that Pro One had undertaken to raise the profile of the championship. Rumours suggested the promoter had spent the promotion budget for the next three years in a single season. Figures of $4–5 million were passed around. OMC called time on the whole European operation at the end of 1985 and in 1986, based solely in North America, the F1 World Series was wound down before it was completely assimilated into the domestic US championship.

From 1987 to 1989, there was no official Formula 1 championship. The FONDA World Grand Prix Series continued to operate with title sponsorship from Budweiser and benefitted from F1's demise in Europe as drivers moved back over. In simple terms Mercury's two litre formula had outlasted OMC's monster 3.5-litre V8s but the reality was far more complex than that. In the United States, Formula 1 lived on, but as far as the world stage was concerned, the powerboat community once again turned to David Parkinson, who having established the Canon Trophy back in 1978, was still at the helm of the FONDA series into which it had evolved. With no other challenger unlike ten years previously, the UIM reinstated the Formula 1 category to World Championship status and in 1990 the FONDA World Grand Prix Series became the Formula 1 World Championship.

David Parkinson continued to manage and promote the championship until the end of 1993, at which point he handed over to Nicolo di San Germano, who continues to lead the series to the present day. Di San Germano has overseen a period of continued improvements in driver safety, managed the championship through multiple economic downturns and seen a shift in focus for the series away from Europe towards the Middle East and Asia, driven by a need for financial stability. The cost has been a heavy one in the eyes of many traditional fans based in Europe as calendars and grid sizes have shrunk but the attraction remains – the series will return to Portugal and France in 2015 and there is a focus on four-stroke technology to finally overhaul the decades-old two-stroke engines that have dominated the sport since the very start.

== Format ==
Inaugurated in 1981, F1 powerboat racing is a Grand Prix style event, in which teams compete around the world each season. In the 2013 season, a total of 23 drivers and 9 teams entered at least one race, with 16 boats competing full-time. The races take place along a track of approximately 350 meters with multiple turns, over which the boats can reach 250 kilometers per hour (155 mph). The races are longer than most powerboat races at approximately 45 minutes, but still shorter than many car races.

== Boats ==
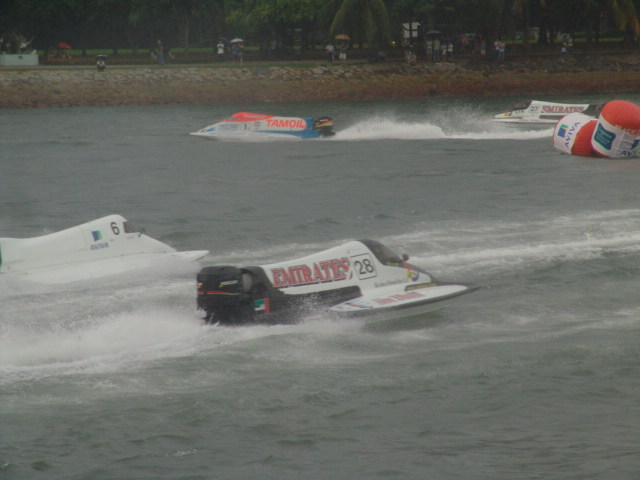
F1 powerboats at the 2004 Grand Prix of Singapore.

F1 racing uses tunnel hull catamarans that are capable of both high speed and exceptional manoeuvrability. Overall, the boats weigh 860 pounds (390 kilograms), including 260 pounds (120 kilograms) of engine. They are 20 feet (6.1 metres) long and seven feet (2.1 metres) wide, keeping weight low through extensive use of carbon fiber and kevlar. The tunnel hull design creates aerodynamic lift due to a 'wing' formed by the deck and under surface of the hull. This increases lift and reduces drag, so that at speed only a few inches of the boat touch the water, leading to the high speed possible with these hulls.

F1 boats are powered by a Mercury Marine V6 two stroke that burns 100LL Avgas at a rate of 120 liters (32 gallons) per hour, generating over 400 horsepower at 10,500 rpm. This engine can propel the boats to 100 km/h (62 mph) in less than two seconds and to a maximum speed of over 250 km/h (160 mph).

== Safety ==
Although F1 boats have not changed much in appearance since the start of the event, the construction and safety has been dramatically improved from the original open-cockpit plywood boats.

The first major development was the hard composite cockpit capsule designed to break away from the rest of the boat in a crash. This also inaugurated the practice of securing the drivers to their seats with a harness. First developed by designer and racer Chris Hodges, this system was optional for a time due to the opposition of the drivers but, after it saved several drivers in major crashes, the UIM mandated it for all boats. In the early 1990s F1 boat builder Dave Burgess introduced a canopy that fully enclosed the cockpit to protect the driver from the full force of water in a nose-dive, similar to the system used in Unlimited hydroplanes a decade earlier. In the late 1990s boat builder DAC introduced an airbag situated behind the driver that prevents the cockpit from completely submerging if the boat flips.

These specific changes in safety features were also accompanied by a progression of lighter and stronger composite hulls that also reduced the hazards of racing. F1 drivers now also wear a HANS Head and Neck Restraint device similar to that worn by their Formula One automobile racing counterparts to combat head and neck injuries.

As of the 2007 season, all boats are required to have a protective crash box installed. Potential future safety features include collapsible bows that would deform rather than penetrate another hull.

== Drivers ==
Before obtaining a Super License to drive an F1 boat, drivers undergo a stringent medical and also an immersion test. This involves being strapped into a mock F1 cockpit. The cell is flipped over and the driver has to make his escape while being judged by safety officials.

== Coverage ==
The series is broadcast live to over twenty countries.

Neil Perkins (journalist/press officer) works as the H2O Racing content writer and produces reports on all of the events.

== Champions ==
=== Formula 1 ===
Season	Champion
1981	(Italy) Renato Molinari
1982	(United Kingdom) Roger Jenkins
1983	(Italy) Renato Molinari
1984	(Italy) Renato Molinari
1985	(United Kingdom) Bob Spalding
1986	(United States) Gene Thibodaux
1987 – 1989: NOT HELD
1990	(United Kingdom) John Hill
1991	(United Kingdom) Jonathan Jones
1992	(Italy) Fabrizio Bocca
1993	(Italy) Guido Cappellini
1994	(Italy) Guido Cappellini
1995	(Italy) Guido Cappellini
1996	(Italy) Guido Cappellini
1997	(United States) Scott Gillman
1998	(United Kingdom) Jonathan Jones
1999	(Italy) Guido Cappellini
2000	(United States) Scott Gillman
2001	(Italy) Guido Cappellini
2002	(Italy) Guido Cappellini
2003	(Italy) Guido Cappellini
2004	(United States) Scott Gillman
2005	(Italy) Guido Cappellini
2006	(United States) Scott Gillman
2007	(Finland) Sami Seliö
2008	(United States) Jay Price
2009	(Italy) Guido Cappellini
2010	(Finland) Sami Seliö
2011	(Italy) Alex Carella
2012	(Italy) Alex Carella
2013	(Italy) Alex Carella
2014	(France) Philippe Chiappe
2015	(France) Philippe Chiappe
2016	(France) Philippe Chiappe
2017	(Italy) Alex Carella
2018	(United States) Shaun Torrente
2019	(United States) Shaun Torrente
2020	Not held
2021	(Sweden) Jonas Andersson
2022	(United States) Shaun Torrente
2023	(Sweden) Jonas Andersson
2024	(Sweden) Jonas Andersson
2025	(United States) Shaun Torrente
2026	TBA

=== World Grand Prix ===
Season	Champion
1981	(United Kingdom) Tony Williams
1982	(Germany) Michael Werner
1983	(Germany) Michael Werner
1984	(United Kingdom) John Hill
1985	(United Kingdom) John Hill
1986	(United Kingdom) Jonathan Jones
1987	(United States) Bill Seebold
1988	(United States) Chris Bush
1989	(United Kingdom) Jonathan Jones

== Formula-4s ==
F-4s is the support class of F1 and has been a part of the series since 2010. Every team has one F-4s boat. The class has two single races per race weekend. The boats use a Mercury 60 HP stock EPA engine and reach a top speed around 120 km/h.

F-4s runs 113 kilo 4 stroke motors rev-limited to 6250 RPM on very short tunnels. The top speed in competition is 120 km/h.

Season	Overall winner
2010	(Sweden) Oskar Samuelsson
2011	(United Kingdom) Matthew Palfreyman
2012	(Sweden) Jesper Forss
2013	(Germany) Mike Szymura
2014	(Germany) Mike Szymura
2015	(Germany) Mike Szymura
2016	(United Arab Emirates) Rashed Al Qamzi
2017	(United Arab Emirates) Mansoor Al Mansoori
2018	(France) Tom Chiappe
2019	(Germany) Max Stilz
2020	No championship held

== Related series ==
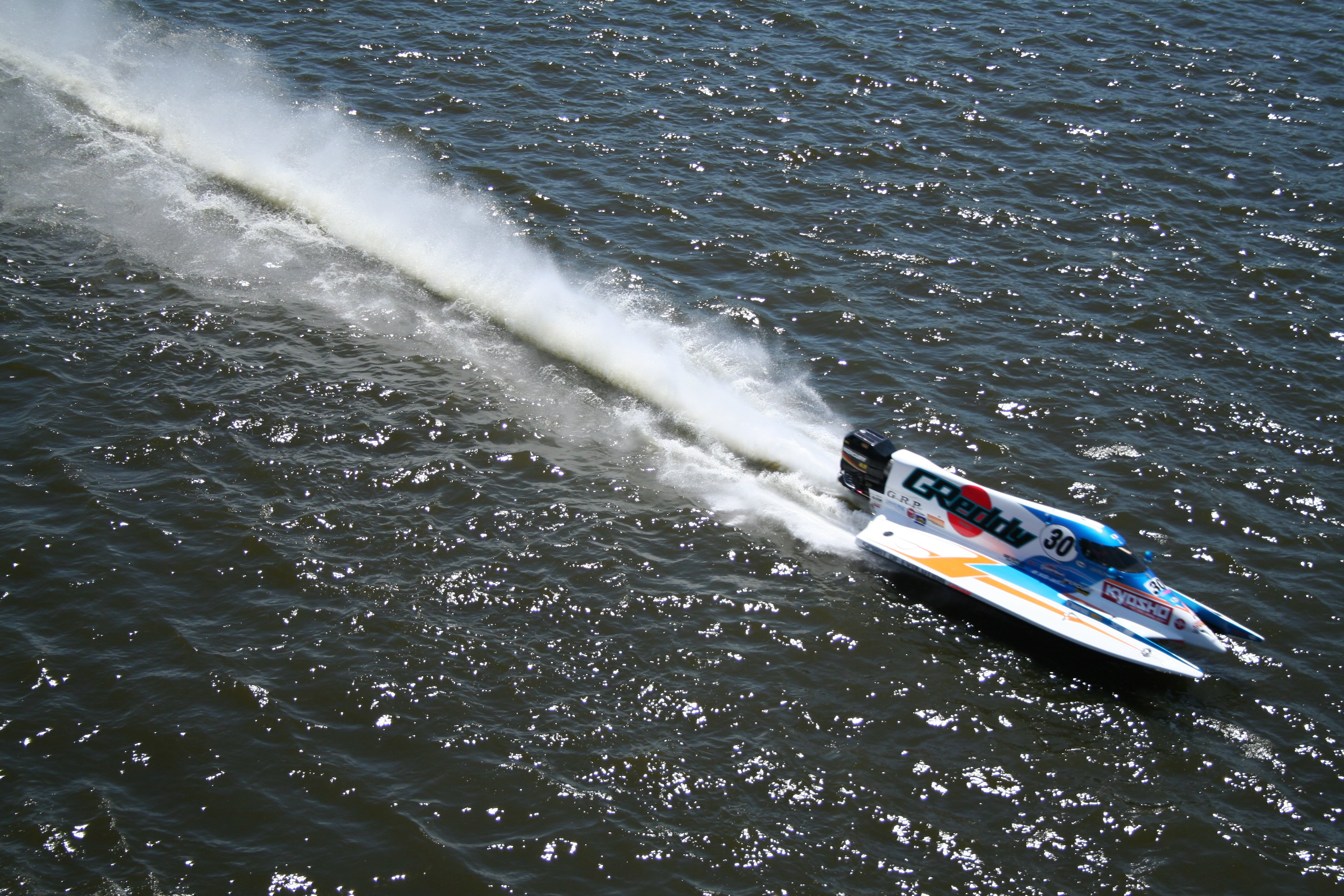
A ChampBoat at the 2006 Minneapolis race.

The USF1 Powerboat Tour is a domestic US-based competition using powerboats that are very similar to those in the F1H2O World Championship. For some years the series co-existed alongside the Mercury-supported ChampBoat series which was formed in 2002 but which had ceased to exist by 2013. Terry Rinker dominated the ChampBoat series with four titles in 2003, 2004, 2006 and 2008.

Additional domestic F1 powerboat championships have been held in Australia, Argentina and South Africa.

== See also ==
- Motorboat racing
- Offshore powerboat racing
- Inshore powerboat racing
