= Sami Seliö =

Finnish powerboat racer (born 1975)

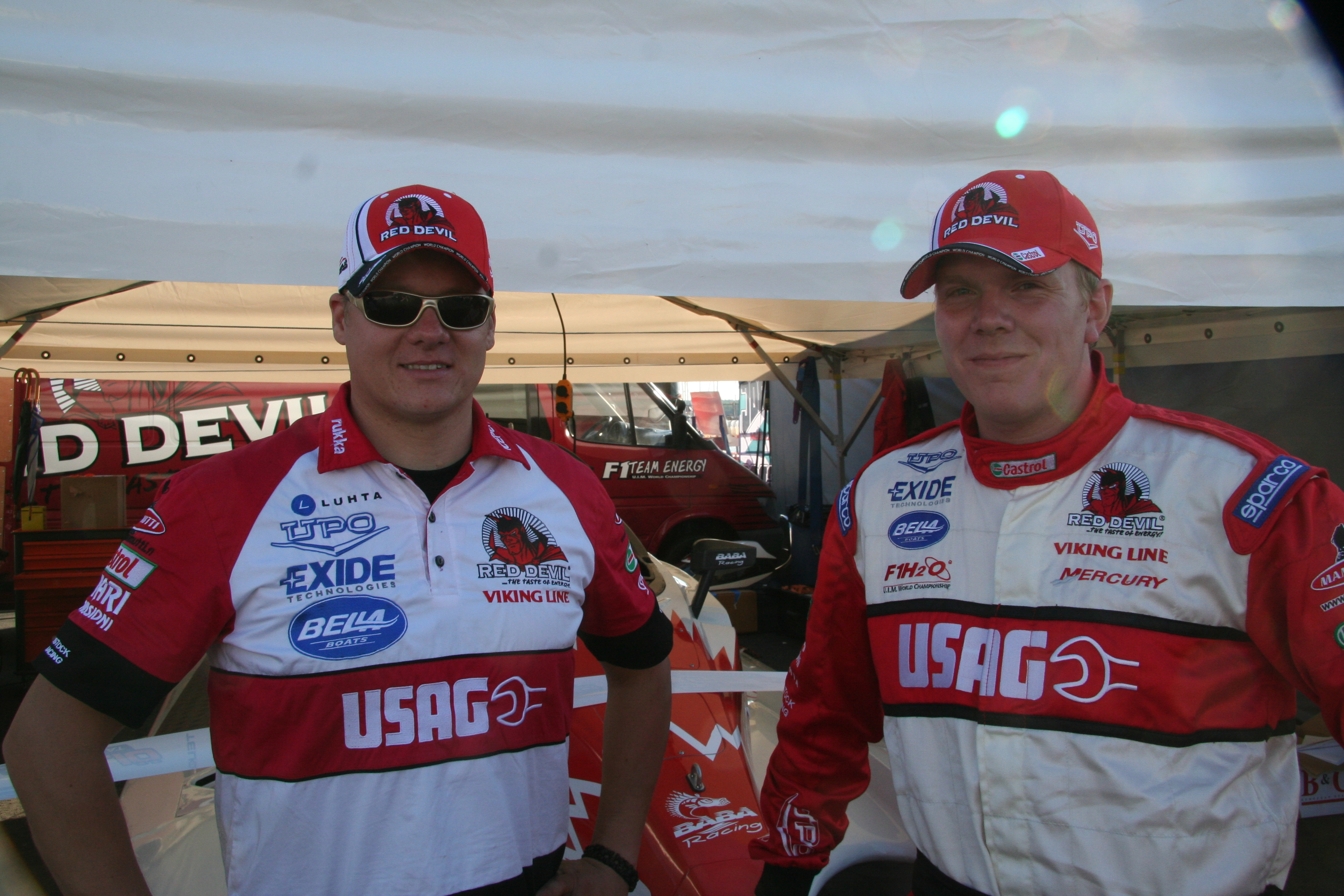
- Sami Seliö (left) in 2008
- Nationality: Finnish
- Born: May 5, 1975 (age 51) Lohja, Finland

F1 Powerboat World Championship career
- Debut season: 1998
- Current team: BaBa Racing
- Former teams: Team Europe; Velden Racing Team; Seliö F1 Powerboat
- Starts: 138
- Wins: 13
- Poles: 25
- Fastest laps: 10
- Best finish: 1st in 2007, 2010

Previous series
- 1996 1988-90: World Formula 4 Finnish SJ-15

Championship titles
- 2007, 2010 1990: F1 Powerboat World Championship; Finnish SJ-15

Sami Seliö (born 5 May 1975 in Lohja, Finland) is a Finnish powerboat racer and two-time Formula 1 Powerboat World Champion. Seliö races for the Mad Croc BaBa Racing team and has competed in the series since 1998.

== Racing career ==
Seliö began his career in Finland in the national SJ-15 class in 1988, a category which he won 1990. By the mid-1990s he had progressed up the classes and in 1996 finished third overall in the Formula 4 World Championship. In 1998, he made his debut in Formula 1 and a string of points finishes earned him the Rookie of the Year award for 1998. Over the following years Seliö gained experience and in 2005 enjoyed his best season to date as he finished second in the championship. Two years later in 2007, Seliö won the first of his World Championships. He was 16 points behind Italian Guido Cappellini entering the last race of the season in Sharjah, but as Cappellini crashed his boat with ten laps to go, Seliö won the race to give him the championship by a margin of just four points.

The 2007 season began a sequence of four consecutive years where Seliö never ended lower than third in the championship. In his title defence year of 2008, he finished runner-up and he slipped one place to third at the end of 2009. The 2010 season would see Seliö clinch his second world title, again coming from behind in the points, this time to beat Jay Price, at the final race of the year.

In October 2011 in Liuzhou, China, Seliö lost control of his boat at 200 km/h and was concussed, broke his ribs and coccyx, and he developed a periorbital hematoma around his right eye. He missed the final two races of the season, but was able to return in time for 2012, where he eventually finished fourth overall. In 2013 Seliö would also finish fourth at the end of the season but entered the final race leading the championship. Having crashed out of qualifying he started well down the field and a retirement in the race meant no points, and the chance at a third title was lost.

== Racing record ==
=== Complete Formula 1 Powerboat World Championship results ===
Year	Entrant	Hull	Engine	1	2	3	4	5	6	7	8	9	10	11	12	13	14	15	16	WDC	Points
1998	Team Europe	Velden	Mercury 2l	ITA	RUS	FRA; Ret	FIN; 6	GRE; 9	ITA; 5	HUN; 5	RUS	ABU; 4								9th	30
1999	Team Europe	Velden	Mercury 2l	POR; 9	ITA; DNS	RUS; C^{1}	FRA; Ret	HUN; Ret	RUS	TUR; 3^{2}	AUT; 6^{3}	ABU; Ret								11th	14
2000	Team Finland	Velden	Johnson 3l	POR; DNS	BEL; DNS	HUN; DNS	LAT; Ret	FRA; DNS	ITA	POL	BUL	TUR	ITA; 6	AUT; Ret	SHA; Ret	ABU; 5				15th	12
2001	Team Finland	DAC	Johnson 3l	MAL; 2	POR; Ret	HUN; 5	LAT; 9	ITA; Ret	ITA; 13	GER; Ret	IRE; 6	SHA; 7	ABU; Ret							9th	33
2002	Vivid Velden Racing Team	DAC	Johnson 3l	POR; 2	ITA; Ret	FIN; Ret	HUN; 5	ITA; Ret	GER; Ret	MAL; Ret	IRE; Ret	SHA; Ret	ABU; DNS							11th	22
2003	Viemerö F1	DAC	Mercury 2.5l	POR; Ret	FIN; Ret	ITA; Ret	GER; DNS	MAL; Ret	SIN; 7	SHA; 5	ABU; 5									10th	18
2004	Seliö F1 Powerboat	BaBa	Mercury 2.5l	IND; 4	KSA; 3	POR; Ret	ITA; 2	ITA; 9	CHN; 9	SIN; 3	MAL; Ret	KOR; 4^{4}	SHA; 3							5th	64
2005	Seliö F1 Powerboat	BaBa	Mercury 2.5l	POR; 12	ITA; 2	SIN; 2^{5}	QAT; 3	ABU; Ret	SHA; 2											2nd	49.5
2006	Red Devil Seliö F1	BaBa	Mercury 2.5l	QAT; 6	POR; Ret	ITA; Ret	CHN; 10	ABU; 6	SHA; 4											10th	20
2007	F1 Team Energy	BaBa	Mercury 2.5l	POR; 4	FRA; 1	CHN; 3	CHN; 3	QAT; 5	QAT; 7	ABU; 1	SHA; 1									1st	104
2008	Woodstock Red Devil Racing	BaBa	Mercury 2.5l	QAT; 4	POR; 8	FIN; Ret	RUS; 2	CHN; Ret	CHN; 1	ABU; 5	SHA; 2									2nd	69
2009	Team Mad Croc	BaBa	Mercury 2.5l	POR; 1 Ret	POR; 2 Ret	FIN; 1; 5	FIN; 2; 3	RUS; 1 Ret	RUS; 2; 2	CHN; 1; 1	CHN; 2 Ret	CHN; 1; 4	CHN; 2; 1	QAT; 1 Ret	QAT; 2; 6	ABU; 1; 3	ABU; 2 Ret	SHA; 1; 2	SHA; 2; 1	3rd	135
2010	Team Mad Croc	BaBa	Mercury 2.5l	POR; DSQ	RUS; 1	CHN; 2	CHN; Ret	CHN; 4	QAT; 2	ABU; 1	SHA; 2									1st	94
2011	Mad Croc F1 Team	BaBa	Mercury 2.5l	QAT; 14	POR; 4	TAR; DNS	UKR; 3	CHN; Ret	ABU	SHA										7th	21
2012	Mad Croc F1 Team	BaBa	Mercury 2.5l	QAT; 3	TAR; 4	UKR; 1	CHN; Ret	ABU; 3	SHA; 5											4th	60
2013	Mad Croc Baba Racing Team	BaBa	Mercury 2.5l	BRA; 1	UKR; 4	CHN; 2	QAT; Ret	ABU; 1	SHA; Ret											4th	64
2014	Mad Croc Baba Racing Team	BaBa	Mercury 2.5l	QAT; Ret	CHN; 8	MID; 3	ABU; 4	SHA; 4												4th	33
2015	Mad Croc Baba Racing Team	BaBa	Mercury 2.5l	QAT; Ret	FRA; 5	POR; Ret	CHN; 3	ABU; 4	SHA; 5											7th	35
2016	Mad Croc BaBa Racing	BaBa	Mercury 2.5l	DUB; DNS	FRA; Ret	POR; 2	CHN; 1	CHN; 3	ABU; 5	SHA; 3										3rd	66
2017	Mad Croc BaBa Racing	BaBa	Mercury 2.5l																	6th	30
2018	Mad Croc BaBa Racing	BaBa	Mercury 2.5l																	8th	28
2019	F1 Sharjah Team	BaBa	Mercury 2.5l																	9th	15
2020*	F1 Sharjah Team	BaBa	Mercury 2.5l																		

* Season still in progress.

- ^1 The 1999 Grand Prix of Russia was halted after 12 laps with results annulled and no points awarded.
- ^2 The starting grid for the 1999 Grand Prix of Turkey was formed on the basis of current championship standings following the İzmit earthquake, with the race held as planned on Sunday 22 August.
- ^3 The 1999 Grand Prix of Austria was stopped after seven laps, with the results taken from the completion of the seventh lap, and no points awarded.
- ^4 The 2004 Grand Prix of Korea was run under the 'match race' format, and the event thus did not count towards the final championship standings and no points were awarded.
- ^5 The 2005 Grand Prix of Singapore was halted after 18 laps, with half points awarded.
