= 2007 F1 Powerboat World Championship =

2007 F1 Powerboat World Championship
Previous:	2006	Next:	2008

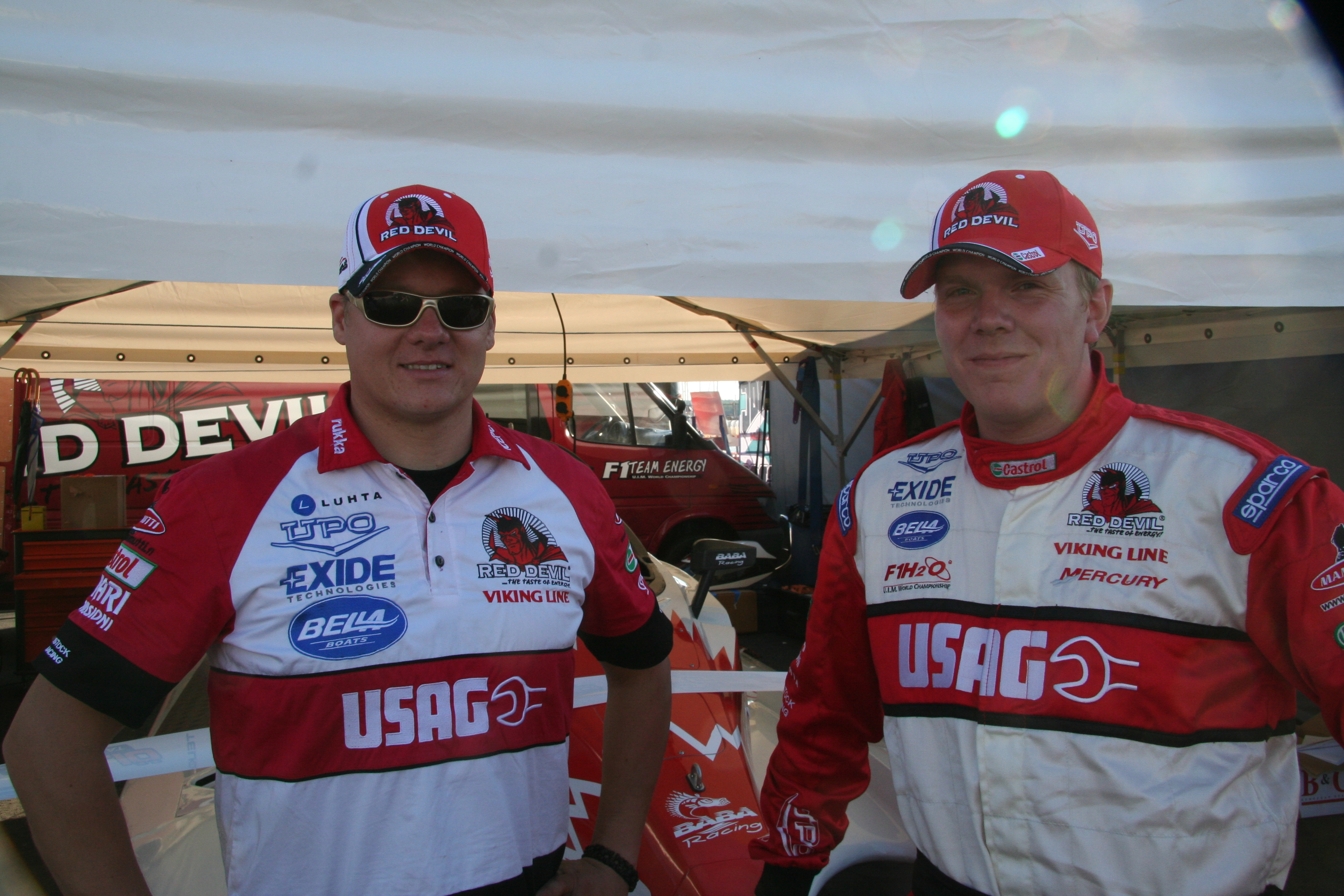
Sami Seliö (left, pictured in 2008) won the first title for a Finnish driver in 2007.

The 2007 UIM F1 World Championship was the 24th season of Formula 1 Powerboat racing. The calendar consisted of eight events, beginning in Portimao, Portugal on 13 May 2007, and ending in Sharjah, UAE on 14 December 2007. Sami Seliö, driving for F1 Team Energy, secured his maiden drivers' title, the first driver outside of Italy, the US and the UK to do so.

== Teams and drivers ==
Team	Hull	Engine	No.	Race drivers	Rounds
(United Arab Emirates) Emirates F1 Team	DAC	Mercury 2.5 V6	1	(United States) Scott Gillman	1–3
(United Arab Emirates) Emirates F1 Team	DAC	Mercury 2.5 V6	1	(United Arab Emirates) Ahmed Al Hameli	4–8
(United Arab Emirates) Emirates F1 Team	DAC	Mercury 2.5 V6	2	(United Arab Emirates) Thani Al Qamzi	All
(United Arab Emirates) Emirates F1 Team	DAC	Mercury 2.5 V6	27	(United Arab Emirates) Ahmed Al Hameli	1–3
(United Arab Emirates) Emirates F1 Team	DAC	Mercury 2.5 V6	27	(United Arab Emirates) Majed Al Mansoori	5–8
(Australia) XPV Racing	GTR	Mercury 2.5 V6	3	(Australia) Bob Trask	All
(Australia) XPV Racing	GTR	Mercury 2.5 V6	4	(Australia) David Trask	All
(Finland) F1 Team Energy	BaBa	Mercury 2.5 V6	5	(Finland) Sami Seliö	All
(Finland) F1 Team Energy	BaBa	Mercury 2.5 V6	6	(Russia) Stanislav Kourtsenovsky	All
(France) CTIC China Team Charente Maritime	DAC	Mercury 2.5 V6	7	(France) Philippe Dessertenne	1, 3–8
(France) CTIC China Team Charente Maritime	DAC	Mercury 2.5 V6	8	(China) Peng Lin Wu	All
(France) CTIC China Team Charente Maritime	DAC	Mercury 2.5 V6	17	(France) Philippe Dessertenne	2
(Portugal) Atlantic Team	BaBa	Mercury 2.5 V6	9	(France) Philippe Chiappe	All
(Portugal) Atlantic Team	Dragon	Mercury 2.5 V6	10	(Portugal) Duarte Benavente	All
Qatar Team	BaBa	Mercury 2.5 V6	11	(United States) Jay Price	All
Qatar Team	DAC	Mercury 2.5 V6	12	(Italy) Leo Bonelli	1–6
Qatar Team	DAC	Mercury 2.5 V6	12	(France) Philippe Tourre	7–8
F1 Team Sweden	DAC	Mercury 2.5 V6	14	(Sweden) Jonas Andersson	All
F1 Team Sweden	DAC	Mercury 2.5 V6	15	(France) Philippe Tourre	1–6
F1 Team Sweden	DAC	Mercury 2.5 V6	15	(Norway) Marit Strømøy	7–8
F1 Team Sweden	DAC	Mercury 2.5 V6	36	(Norway) Marit Strømøy	5–6
(Italy) Comparato Racing Team	Comparato	Mercury 2.5 V6	19	(Italy) Fabio Comparato	All
(Italy) Comparato Racing Team	Comparato	Mercury 2.5 V6	20	(Sweden) Pierre Lundin	All
(Italy) Tamoil F1 Team	DAC	Mercury 2.5 V6	21	(Italy) Guido Cappellini	All
(Italy) Tamoil F1 Team	DAC	Mercury 2.5 V6	22	(Italy) Marco Gambi	1–2
(Italy) Tamoil F1 Team	DAC	Mercury 2.5 V6	22	(Italy) Ivan Brigada	3–6
(Italy) Tamoil F1 Team	DAC	Mercury 2.5 V6	22	(Latvia) Ugis Gross	7–8
(Italy) Singha Racing Team	Blaze	Mercury 2.5 V6	23	(Italy) Franco Leidi	All
(Italy) Singha Racing Team	Blaze	Mercury 2.5 V6	24	(Italy) Francesco Cantando	All
(Italy) Singha Racing Team	DAC	Mercury 2.5 V6	35	(Italy) Marco Gambi	7–8
(Italy) Rainbow Team	DAC	Mercury 2.5 V6	31	(Italy) Fabrizio Bocca	All
(Italy) Rainbow Team	DAC	Mercury 2.5 V6	32	(Italy) Valerio Lagiannella	1–6
(Italy) Rainbow Team	DAC	Mercury 2.5 V6	32	(United States) Shaun Torrente	7
(United Kingdom) ACE Racing	Dragon	Mercury 2.5 V6	33	(United Kingdom) Andy Elliott	2, 7–8
(Italy) Woodstock Racing Team	BaBa	Mercury 2.5 V6	46	(Italy) Massimo Roggiero	7–8

Key
Regular boat/driver
Boat ineligible for team points

== Season calendar ==
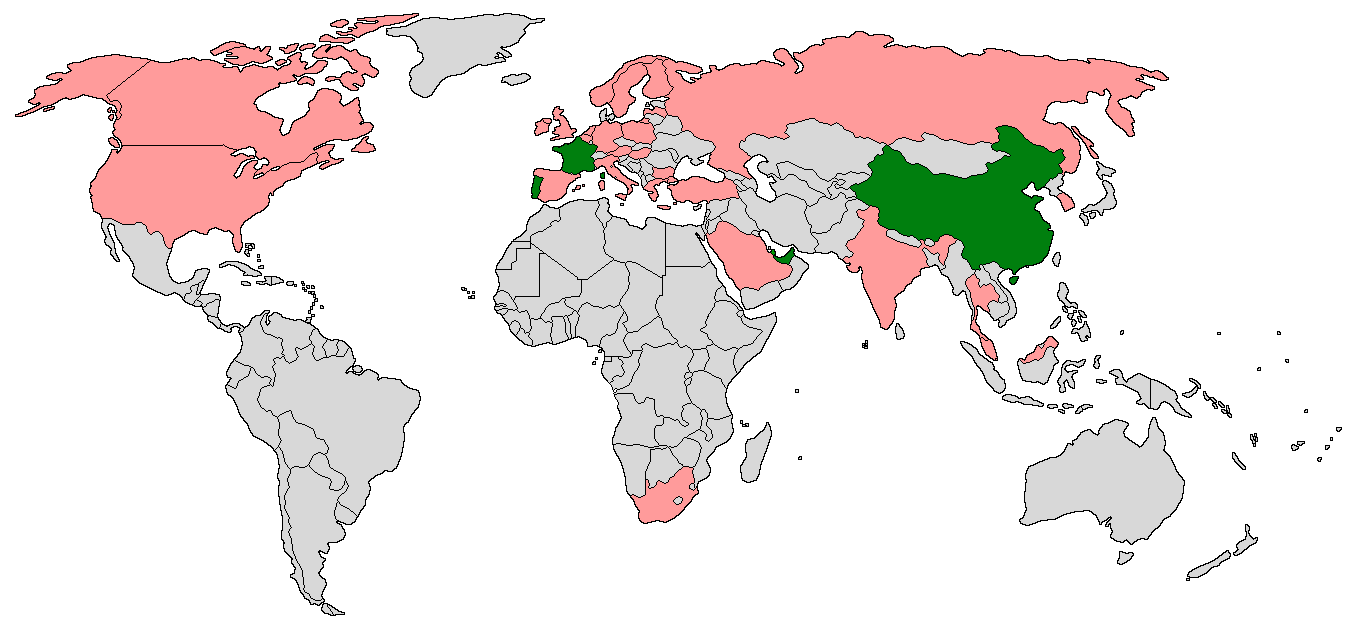
Countries that hosted F1 Powerboat races in 2007, shown in green. Former host nations are shown in pink.

Round	Race title	Date	Circuit location	Race winner	Hull/Engine
1	9th Grand Prix of Portugal	13 May	Portimão	(United States) Scott Gillman	DAC/Mercury
2	18th Grand Prix of France	20 May	La Rochelle	(Finland) Sami Seliö	BaBa/Mercury
3	6th Grand Prix of China	5 October	Xi'an	(United Arab Emirates) Thani Al Qamzi	DAC/Mercury
4	7th Grand Prix of China	21 October	Shenzhen	(Italy) Guido Cappellini	DAC/Mercury
5	3rd Grand Prix of Qatar	24 November	Doha	(United Arab Emirates) Thani Al Qamzi	DAC/Mercury
6	4th Grand Prix of Qatar	27 November	Doha	(Italy) Guido Cappellini	DAC/Mercury
7	(United Arab Emirates) 15th Grand Prix of Abu Dhabi	7 December	Abu Dhabi	(Finland) Sami Seliö	BaBa/Mercury
8	(United Arab Emirates) 8th Grand Prix of Sharjah	14 December	Sharjah	(Finland) Sami Seliö	BaBa/Mercury

== Results and standings ==
Points were awarded to the top 10 classified finishers. A maximum of two boats per team were eligible for points in the teams' championship.

Position	**1st**	**2nd**	**3rd**	**4th**	**5th**	**6th**	**7th**	**8th**	**9th**	**10th**
Points	20	15	12	9	7	5	4	3	2	1

=== Drivers standings ===
Pos	Driver	POR (Portugal)	FRA (France)	CHN (China)	CHN (China)	QAT (Qatar)	QAT (Qatar)	ABU (United Arab Emirates)	SHA (United Arab Emirates)	Points
1	(Finland) Sami Seliö	4	1	3	3	5	7	**1**	**1**	104
2	(Italy) Guido Cappellini	2	Ret	**2**	**1**	2	**1**	2	Ret	100
3	(United Arab Emirates) Thani Al Qamzi	Ret	Ret	1	2	**1**	2	Ret	4	79
4	(Sweden) Pierre Lundin	6	Ret	4	DNS	3	3	4	7	51
5	(United States) Jay Price	3	4	Ret	Ret	Ret	5	7	2	47
6	(United States) Scott Gillman	**1**	2	Ret						35
7	(Australia) David Trask	7	**Ret**	5	Ret	8	Ret	6	3	31
8	(France) Philippe Chiappe	8	5	Ret	Ret	4	6	Ret	6	29
9	(Sweden) Jonas Andersson	Ret	3	Ret	Ret	Ret	Ret	3	Ret	24
10	(United Arab Emirates) Ahmed Al Hameli	Ret	Ret	9	Ret	12	4	Ret	5	18
11	(Italy) Francesco Cantando	Ret	Ret	10	6	6	Ret	5	Ret	18
12	(France) Philippe Dessertenne	5	DSQ	DNS	5	10	Ret	Ret	Ret	15
13	(Italy) Fabrizio Bocca	9	8	8	8	9	9	Ret	DNS	15
14	(Italy) Ivan Brigada			Ret	4	Ret	DNS			9
15	(France) Philippe Tourre	Ret	Ret	6	Ret	7	DNS	Ret	Ret	9
16	(Russia) Stanislav Kourtsenovsky	15	6	Ret	11	Ret	DNS	8	Ret	8
17	(Portugal) Duarte Benavente	Ret	9	7	10	Ret	DNS	11	Ret	7
18	(Italy) Leo Bonelli	10	7	DNS	9	DNS	Ret			7
19	(Australia) Bob Trask	11	11	11	7	Ret	10	13	Ret	5
20	(United Kingdom) Andy Elliott		12					9	9	4
21	(Norway) Marit Strømøy					11	11	Ret	8	3
22	(Italy) Fabio Comparato	Ret	Ret	14	12	Ret	8	Ret	DNS	3
23	(Italy) Franco Leidi	14	DNS	15	14	14	13	Ret	10	1
24	(Italy) Marco Gambi	Ret	10					Ret	Ret	1
25	(Latvia) Ugis Gross							10	DNS	1
26	(China) Peng Lin Wu	13	Ret	13	Ret	DNS	12	12	DNS	0
27	(Italy) Valerio Lagiannella	12	Ret	12	13	Ret	DNS			0
28	(Italy) Massimo Roggiero							Ret	Ret	0
29	(United Arab Emirates) Majed Al Mansoori					DNS	DNS	Ret	DNS	0
30	(United States) Shaun Torrente							DNS		0

Key
Colour	Result
Gold	Winner
Silver	Second place
Bronze	Third place
Green	Other points position
Blue	Other classified position
Blue	Not classified, finished (NC)
Purple	Not classified, retired (Ret)
Red	Did not qualify (DNQ)
Red	Did not pre-qualify (DNPQ)
Black	Disqualified (DSQ)
White	Did not start (DNS)
White	Race cancelled (C)
Blank	Did not practice (DNP)
Blank	Excluded (EX)
Blank	Did not arrive (DNA)
Blank	Withdrawn (WD)
Blank	Did not enter (cell empty)
Text formatting	Meaning
**Bold**	Pole position
Italics	Fastest lap

=== Teams standings ===
Only boats with results eligible for points counting towards the teams' championship are shown here.

Pos	Team	Boat No.	QAT (Qatar)	POR (Portugal)	FIN (Finland)	RUS (Russia)	CHN (China)	CHN (China)	ABU (United Arab Emirates)	SHA (United Arab Emirates)	Points
1	(United Arab Emirates) Emirates F1 Team	1	**1**	2	Ret	Ret	12	4	Ret	5	130
1	(United Arab Emirates) Emirates F1 Team	2	Ret	Ret	1	2	**1**	2	Ret	4	130
2	(Finland) F1 Team Energy	5	4	1	3	3	5	7	**1**	**1**	112
2	(Finland) F1 Team Energy	6	15	6	Ret	11	Ret	DNS	8	Ret	112
3	(Italy) Tamoil F1 Team	21	2	Ret	**2**	**1**	2	**1**	2	Ret	110
3	(Italy) Tamoil F1 Team	22	Ret	10	Ret	4	Ret	DNS	10	DNS	110
4	Qatar Team	11	3	4	Ret	Ret	Ret	5	7	2	63
4	Qatar Team	12	10	7	DNS	9	DNS	Ret	Ret	Ret	63
5	(Italy) Comparato Racing Team	19	Ret	Ret	14	12	Ret	8	Ret	DNS	54
5	(Italy) Comparato Racing Team	20	6	Ret	4	DNS	3	3	4	7	54
6	(Australia) XPV Racing	3	11	11	11	7	Ret	10	13	Ret	36
6	(Australia) XPV Racing	4	7	**Ret**	5	Ret	8	Ret	6	3	36
7	(Portugal) Atlantic Team	9	8	5	Ret	Ret	4	6	Ret	6	36
7	(Portugal) Atlantic Team	10	Ret	9	7	10	Ret	DNS	11	Ret	36
8	F1 Team Sweden	14	Ret	3	Ret	Ret	Ret	Ret	3	Ret	27
8	F1 Team Sweden	15	Ret	Ret	6	Ret	7	DNS	Ret	8	27
9	(Italy) Singha Racing Team	23	14	DNS	15	14	14	13	Ret	10	20
9	(Italy) Singha Racing Team	24	Ret	Ret	10	6	6	Ret	5	Ret	20
10	(France) CTIC China Team Charente Maritime	7	5		DNS	5	10	Ret	Ret	Ret	15
10	(France) CTIC China Team Charente Maritime	8	13	Ret	13	Ret	DNS	12	12	DNS	15
11	(Italy) Rainbow Team	31	9	8	8	8	9	9	Ret	DNS	15
11	(Italy) Rainbow Team	32	12	Ret	12	13	Ret	DNS	DNS		15
12	(United Kingdom) ACE Racing	33		12					9	9	4
13	(Italy) Woodstock Racing Team	46							Ret	Ret	0

Key
Colour	Result
Gold	Winner
Silver	Second place
Bronze	Third place
Green	Other points position
Blue	Other classified position
Blue	Not classified, finished (NC)
Purple	Not classified, retired (Ret)
Red	Did not qualify (DNQ)
Red	Did not pre-qualify (DNPQ)
Black	Disqualified (DSQ)
White	Did not start (DNS)
White	Race cancelled (C)
Blank	Did not practice (DNP)
Blank	Excluded (EX)
Blank	Did not arrive (DNA)
Blank	Withdrawn (WD)
Blank	Did not enter (cell empty)
Text formatting	Meaning
**Bold**	Pole position
Italics	Fastest lap
