= 2012 F1 Powerboat World Championship =

2012 F1 Powerboat World Championship
Previous:	2011	Next:	2013

The 2012 UIM F1 H_{2}O World Championship was the 29th season of Formula 1 Powerboat racing. Whilst a provisional calendar consisted of a total of nine rounds, following cancellations, an amended programme of six races, beginning in Doha, Qatar, on 10 March 2012, and ending in Sharjah, UAE, on 7 December 2012 was published by the UIM. At the penultimate race of the year in Abu Dhabi, reigning champion Alex Carella successfully defended his 2011 drivers' title, the Italian becoming a double world champion for the Qatar Team.

== Teams and drivers ==
Team	Hull	Engine	No.	Race drivers	Rounds
Qatar Team	DAC	Mercury 2.5 V6	1	(Italy) Alex Carella	All
Qatar Team	DAC	Mercury 2.5 V6	2	(United States) Shaun Torrente	1–4
Qatar Team	DAC	Mercury 2.5 V6	2	(United States) Terry Rinker	5–6
Qatar Team	DAC	Mercury 2.5 V6	13	(Qatar) Khalid Al Shamlan	1
(United States) Team Nautica	BaBa	Mercury 2.5 V6	3	(Switzerland) Rinaldo Osculati	All
(United States) Team Nautica	BaBa	Mercury 2.5 V6	4	(Norway) Marit Strømøy	All
(United Arab Emirates) Team Abu Dhabi	BaBa	Mercury 2.5 V6	5	(United Arab Emirates) Thani Al Qamzi	All
(United Arab Emirates) Team Abu Dhabi	BaBa	Mercury 2.5 V6	6	(United Arab Emirates) Ahmed Al Hameli	1–3
(United Arab Emirates) Team Abu Dhabi	BaBa	Mercury 2.5 V6	6	(United Arab Emirates) Majed Al Mansoori	4–5
(United Arab Emirates) Team Abu Dhabi	BaBa	Mercury 2.5 V6	6	(United States) Scott Gillman	6
(United Arab Emirates) Team Abu Dhabi	BaBa	Mercury 2.5 V6	27	(United States) Scott Gillman^{^{1}}	5
CTIC China Team	Moore	Mercury 2.5 V6	7	(France) Philippe Chiappe	All
CTIC China Team	DAC	Mercury 2.5 V6	8	(Russia) Stanislav Kourtsenovsky	All
CTIC China Team	DAC	Mercury 2.5 V6	81	(China) Xiong Ziwei	5–6
(Portugal) F1 Atlantic Team	BaBa	Mercury 2.5 V6	9	(France) Philippe Tourre	All
(Portugal) F1 Atlantic Team	BaBa	Mercury 2.5 V6	10	(Portugal) Duarte Benavente	All
(Portugal) F1 Atlantic Team	DAC	Mercury 2.5 V6	19	(Kuwait) Youssef Al Rubayan	All
(Italy) Mad Croc F1 Team	BaBa	Mercury 2.5 V6	11	(Finland) Sami Seliö	All
(Italy) Mad Croc F1 Team	BaBa	Mercury 2.5 V6	12	(Finland) Filip Roms	All
Team Sweden	BaBa	Mercury 2.5 V6	14	(Sweden) Jonas Andersson	1–2
Team Sweden	Molgaard	Mercury 2.5 V6	14	(Sweden) Jonas Andersson	3–6
Team Sweden	DAC	Mercury 2.5 V6	15	(Australia) Rhys Coles	1
Team Sweden	Molgaard	Mercury 2.5 V6	15	(Sweden) Bimba Sjoholm	4
Team Sweden	Molgaard	Mercury 2.5 V6	15	(Sweden) Erik Stark	5–6
(United Kingdom) Dragon F1 Team	Dragon	Mercury 2.5 V6	22	(United Kingdom) Malcolm Goodman	5–6
(Italy) Singha F1 Racing Team	DAC	Mercury 2.5 V6	23	(Italy) Valerio Lagiannella	1–2, 4–6
(Italy) Singha F1 Racing Team	Blaze	Mercury 2.5 V6	24	(Italy) Francesco Cantando	All
(South Africa) Caudwell Racing	Caudwell	Caudwell 3.5 V6	25	(Italy) Ivan Brigada	All
(South Africa) Caudwell Racing	Caudwell	Caudwell 3.5 V6	26	(South Africa) Brett Stuart	All
(United Arab Emirates) Skydive Dubai	BaBa	Mercury 2.5 V6	33	(United States) Jay Price	5–6

Key
Regular boat/driver
Boat ineligible for team points

- ^1 Scott Gillman was initially entered into the Abu Dhabi GP as driving a BaBa hull, powered by a Hartley V8 four stroke engine based on a Suzuki Hayabusa motorcycle engine. He switched just before qualifying however to a Mercury 2.5-litre two stroke after feeling that the V8 was too powerful for the BaBa hull.

=== Team changes ===
The eight full-time teams from 2011 continued into 2012, with an additional ninth team, Caudwell Racing from South Africa, entered. Their entry was officially confirmed in June 2011, making history by introducing four-stroke engines into the series which had been dominated in recent times by the two-stroke Mercury engines. The revolutionary engine was based on an Infiniti road car engine and featured Cosworth pistons and conrods in its design.

With Russian driver Stanislav Kourtsenovsky moving to the CTIC China Team, the part-time Jetech Tools F1 Team from 2011 didn't participate in 2012. At the beginning of May, former German driver Fabian Kalsow announced his intention to re-enter the series with a team for the latter half of the 2012 season, with a longer-term view to an entry for 2013. This failed to materialise however, but despite that, two new teams lodged entries for the final two races of the year. Former champion Jonathan Jones' hull manufacturing firm Dragon entered with British driver Malcolm Goodman driving, and a second Emirati-based team, Skydive Dubai joined the series, with 2008 champion Jay Price, having last competed themselves in 2009.

=== Driver changes ===
Following the conclusion of the 2011 season, by far the biggest driver change for 2012 was the resignation of Jay Price from the Qatar Team. His replacement alongside newly crowned champion Alex Carella, was Shaun Torrente who had driven for the team alongside Price and Carella for the final two races of 2011. At the CTIC China Team, Pierre Lundin was replaced by Russian driver Stanislav Kourtsenovsky who had made two appearances during the 2011 season for the Jetech Tools F1 Team. F1 Atlantic Team signed Kuwaiti Youssef Al Rubayan for a full campaign in a third boat alongside the retained Tourre and Benavente whilst Filip Roms joined compatriot Sami Seliö at the Mad Croc team, replacing Davide Padovan. Ivan Brigada, having raced on one occasion for the Singha F1 Team in 2011, moved to the new Caudwell team for 2012 to partner South African Brett Stuart.

At the first race of the year in Qatar, Khalid Al Shamlan made a one-off appearance at his home event for the Qatar Team alongside Carella and Torrente. After the race however, Rhys Coles left Team Sweden. Having driven for them for the latter half of 2011, he had been retained for 2012, but parted ways following the Qatar race.

In the lead up to the fourth race of the season in China, then-championship leader Ahmed Al Hameli was diagnosed with a brain tumour, undergoing successful surgery in the US, but was forced to miss the Chinese round. His replacement was fellow Emirati Majed Al Mansoori. It would later transpire that Al Hameli would miss the remainder of the season. At the same race, Bimba Sjoholm made history by ensuring that two women would start an F1 Powerboat World Championship race for the first time when she drove the second Team Sweden boat that had been vacated since Rhys Coles left the team. She drove a brand new Molgaard hull, with teammate Jonas Andersson having debuted his at the previous race in Ukraine, switching from his previous BaBa.

Following the race in China, Shaun Torrente had his Superlicence withdrawn by the UIM and banned for the next two races after his sixth crash in just ten races, this time also forcing Sami Seliö into retirement, and thus all but ending the Finn's championship hopes. Two weeks before the Abu Dhabi race, fellow American Terry Rinker was announced as Torrente's replacement.

As the season entered its final stages, further changes took place throughout the field. Prior to the race in Abu Dhabi, the penultimate round of the season, along with Rinker, a further five new drivers came into the series. Team Sweden announced that recently crowned double F2 champion Erik Stark would replace Bimba Sjoholm for the rest of the year. In addition, Malcolm Goodman returned to F1 as British F2 champion having had a previous outing in 2009, and would race for the new Dragon F1 Team. Jay Price made his return to the series having left the Qatar Team following the 2011 season in acrimonious circumstances, entering with the other new team, Skydive Dubai, whilst fellow American and multiple champion Scott Gillman returned to the cockpit in a third Team Abu Dhabi boat. Gillman initially intended to trial a new Hartley four stroke V8 engine but later abandoned the experiment prior to qualifying, instead reverting to the normal Mercury two stroke. Finally for Abu Dhabi, Xiong Ziwei became only the second Chinese driver to enter an F1 powerboat race, driving a third boat for the CTIC China Team.

For the final round of the year in Sharjah, Team Abu Dhabi went back to a two boat team, after the difficulties with the Hartley four stroke engine. Scott Gillman continued on with driving duties though, replacing Majed Al Mansoori in the No. 6 boat for his third race start in five years.

== Season calendar ==
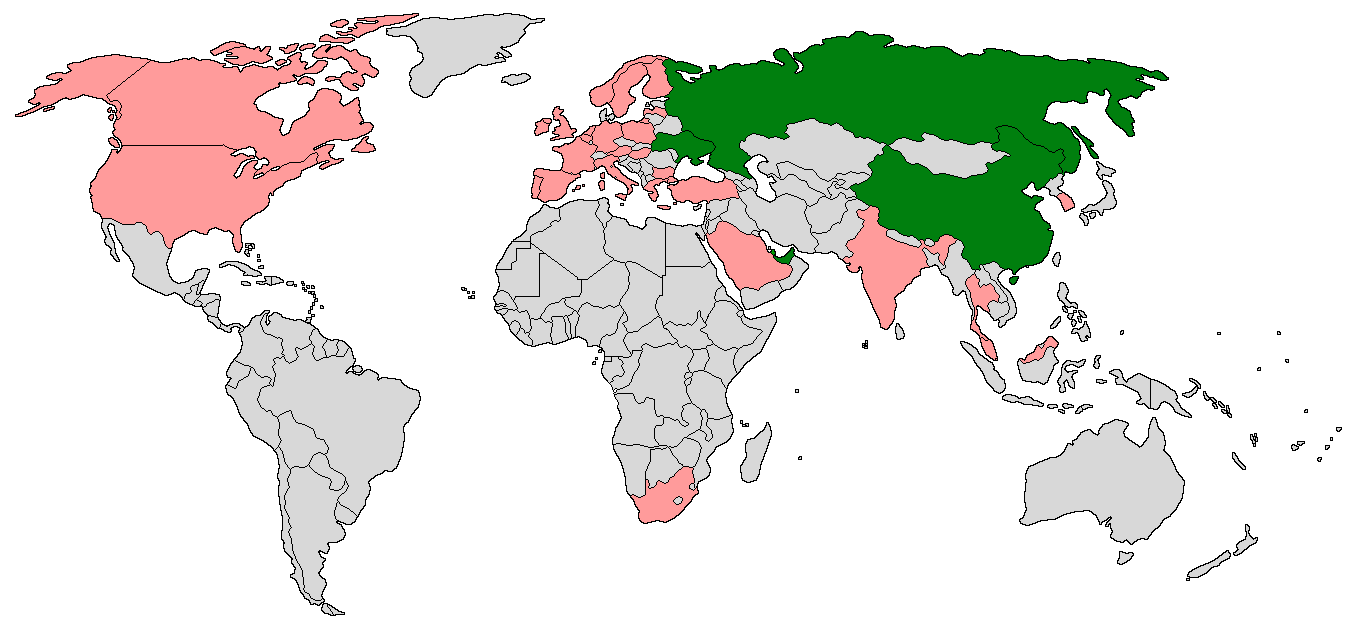
Countries that hosted F1 Powerboat races in 2012, shown in green. Former host nations are shown in pink.

Initial plans for the 2012 season included an expanded calendar of nine events, two more than 2011. The round at Portimao was dropped, with new races planned for Venice, St Petersburg, and Perth. Following the first race at Doha, on 23 March, an amended calendar was released with just five further confirmed races, and an additional event in November still to be finalised. Ultimately however, the calendar was further shortened to six races when plans for the expected fifth round were abandoned, with the date removed from the series' official website in late October.

Round	Race title	Date	Circuit location	Race winner	Hull/Engine
1	9th Grand Prix of Qatar	10 March	Doha	(United Arab Emirates) Ahmed Al Hameli	BaBa/Mercury
2	(Russia) 2nd Grand Prix of Tatarstan	23 June	Kazan	(Italy) Alex Carella	DAC/Mercury
3	2nd Grand Prix of Ukraine	21 July	Vyshhorod	(Finland) Sami Seliö	BaBa/Mercury
4	16th Grand Prix of China	2 October	Liuzhou	(Italy) Alex Carella	DAC/Mercury
5	(United Arab Emirates) 20th Grand Prix of Abu Dhabi	30 November	Abu Dhabi	(Italy) Alex Carella	DAC/Mercury
6	(United Arab Emirates) 13th Grand Prix of Sharjah	7 December	Sharjah	(United Arab Emirates) Thani Al Qamzi	BaBa/Mercury

== Results and standings ==
Points were awarded to the top 10 classified finishers. A maximum of two boats per team were eligible for points in the teams' championship.

Position	**1st**	**2nd**	**3rd**	**4th**	**5th**	**6th**	**7th**	**8th**	**9th**	**10th**
Points	20	15	12	9	7	5	4	3	2	1

=== Drivers standings ===
Pos	Driver	QAT (Qatar)	RUS (Russia)	UKR (Ukraine)	CHN (China)	ABU (United Arab Emirates)	SHA (United Arab Emirates)	Points
1	(Italy) Alex Carella	5	1	3	**1**	**1**	Ret	79
2	(France) Philippe Chiappe	2	3	4	3	4	6	62
3	(United Arab Emirates) Thani Al Qamzi	Ret	6	6	2	2	1	60
4	(Finland) Sami Seliö	3	4	**1**	Ret	3	**5**	60
5	(United Arab Emirates) Ahmed Al Hameli	**1**	2	2				50
6	(Italy) Francesco Cantando	6	Ret	5	4	6	3	38
7	(Sweden) Jonas Andersson	Ret	5	8	Ret	5	4	26
8	(United States) Terry Rinker					8	2	18
9	(Russia) Stanislav Kourtsenovsky	8	7	Ret	7	9	Ret	13
10	(Kuwait) Youssef Al Rubayan	Ret	Ret	7	5	Ret	Ret	11
11	(United States) Shaun Torrente	4	**Ret**	10	Ret			10
12	(Finland) Filip Roms	7	DNS	Ret	8	10	9	10
13	(Norway) Marit Strømøy	Ret	Ret	Ret	10	7	8	8
14	(Italy) Valerio Lagiannella	10	8		9	12	Ret	6
15	(United Arab Emirates) Majed Al Mansoori				6	13		5
16	(United States) Scott Gillman					Ret	7	4
17	(Portugal) Duarte Benavente	DSQ	Ret	9	Ret	11	DNS	2
18	(France) Philippe Toure	Ret	9	Ret	DNS	Ret	Ret	2
19	(Qatar) Khalid Al Shamlan	9						2
20	(Italy) Ivan Brigada	DNS	Ret	Ret	Ret	14	10	1
21	(South Africa) Brett Stuart	Ret	Ret	Ret	11	16	DNS	0
22	(China) Xiong Ziwei					Ret	11	0
23	(Switzerland) Rinaldo Osculati	Ret	Ret	Ret	Ret	15	12	0
24	(United States) Jay Price					Ret	Ret	0
25	(United Kingdom) Malcolm Goodman					Ret	Ret	0
26	(Sweden) Erik Stark					Ret	Ret	0
27	(Australia) Rhys Coles	Ret						0
28	(Sweden) Bimba Sjoholm				Ret			0

Key
Colour	Result
Gold	Winner
Silver	Second place
Bronze	Third place
Green	Other points position
Blue	Other classified position
Blue	Not classified, finished (NC)
Purple	Not classified, retired (Ret)
Red	Did not qualify (DNQ)
Red	Did not pre-qualify (DNPQ)
Black	Disqualified (DSQ)
White	Did not start (DNS)
White	Race cancelled (C)
Blank	Did not practice (DNP)
Blank	Excluded (EX)
Blank	Did not arrive (DNA)
Blank	Withdrawn (WD)
Blank	Did not enter (cell empty)
Text formatting	Meaning
**Bold**	Pole position
Italics	Fastest lap

=== Teams standings ===
Only boats with results eligible for points counting towards the teams' championship are shown here.

Pos	Team	Boat No.	QAT (Qatar)	RUS (Russia)	UKR (Ukraine)	CHN (China)	ABU (United Arab Emirates)	SHA (United Arab Emirates)	Points
1	(United Arab Emirates) Team Abu Dhabi	5	Ret	6	6	2	2	1	119
1	(United Arab Emirates) Team Abu Dhabi	6	**1**	2	2	6	13	7	119
2	Qatar Team	1	5	1	3	**1**	**1**	Ret	107
2	Qatar Team	2	4	**Ret**	10	Ret	8	2	107
3	CTIC China Team	7	2	3	4	3	4	6	75
3	CTIC China Team	8	8	7	Ret	7	9	Ret	75
4	(Italy) Mad Croc F1 Team	11	3	4	**1**	Ret	3	**5**	70
4	(Italy) Mad Croc F1 Team	12	7	DNS	Ret	8	10	9	70
5	(Italy) Singha F1 Racing Team	23	10	8		9	12	Ret	44
5	(Italy) Singha F1 Racing Team	24	6	Ret	5	4	6	3	44
6	Team Sweden	14	Ret	5	8	Ret	5	4	26
6	Team Sweden	15	Ret			Ret	Ret	Ret	26
7	(United States) Team Nautica	3	Ret	Ret	Ret	Ret	15	12	8
7	(United States) Team Nautica	4	Ret	Ret	Ret	10	7	8	8
8	(Portugal) F1 Atlantic Team	9	Ret	9	Ret	DNS	Ret	Ret	4
8	(Portugal) F1 Atlantic Team	10	DSQ	Ret	9	Ret	11	DNS	4
9	(South Africa) Caudwell Racing	25	DNS	Ret	Ret	Ret	14	10	1
9	(South Africa) Caudwell Racing	26	Ret	Ret	Ret	11	16	DNS	1
10	(United Arab Emirates) Skydive Dubai	33					Ret	Ret	0
11	(United Kingdom) Dragon F1 Team	22					Ret	Ret	0

Key
Colour	Result
Gold	Winner
Silver	Second place
Bronze	Third place
Green	Other points position
Blue	Other classified position
Blue	Not classified, finished (NC)
Purple	Not classified, retired (Ret)
Red	Did not qualify (DNQ)
Red	Did not pre-qualify (DNPQ)
Black	Disqualified (DSQ)
White	Did not start (DNS)
White	Race cancelled (C)
Blank	Did not practice (DNP)
Blank	Excluded (EX)
Blank	Did not arrive (DNA)
Blank	Withdrawn (WD)
Blank	Did not enter (cell empty)
Text formatting	Meaning
**Bold**	Pole position
Italics	Fastest lap
