= 2008 F1 Powerboat World Championship =

2008 F1 Powerboat World Championship
Previous:	2007	Next:	2009

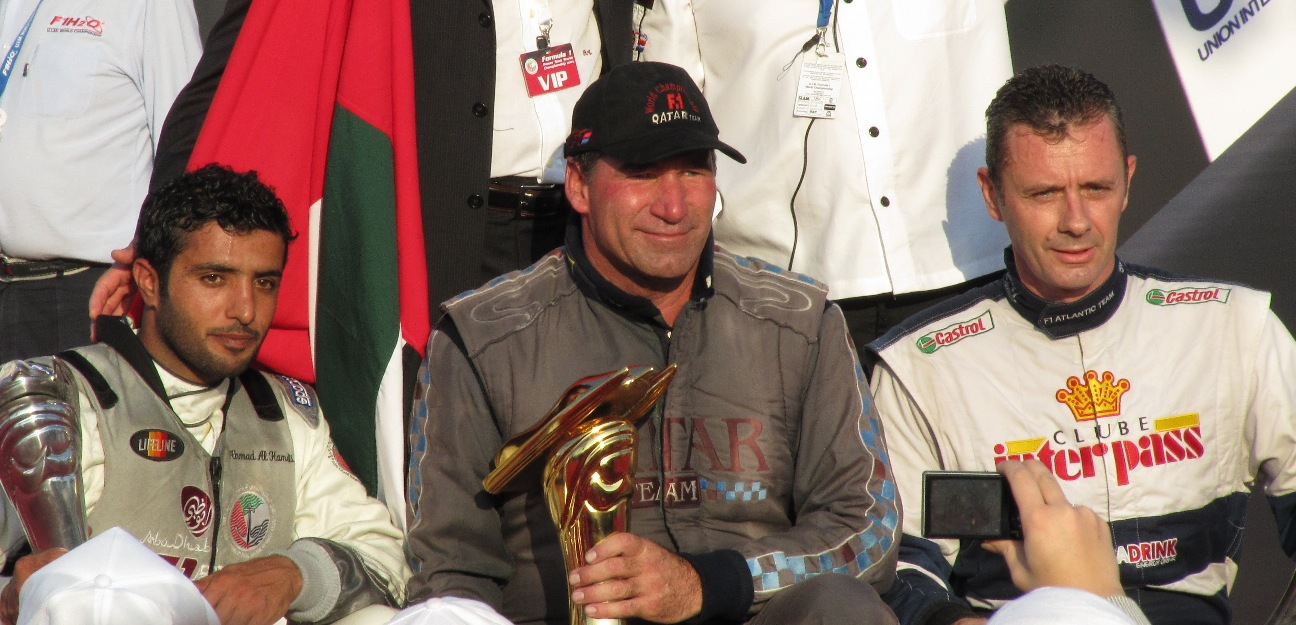
Jay Price (centre, pictured in 2009) won the 2008 world title with 105 points.

The 2008 UIM F1 World Championship was the 25th season of Formula 1 Powerboat racing. The calendar consisted of eight events, beginning in Doha, Qatar on 29 March 2008, and ending in Sharjah, UAE on 12 December 2008. Jay Price, driving for the Qatar Team, secured the drivers' title, becoming only the second American to win the championship in its history.

== Teams and drivers ==
Team	Hull	Engine	No.	Race drivers	Rounds
(Finland) Woodstock Red Devil Racing	BaBa	Mercury 2.5 V6	1	(Finland) Sami Seliö	All
(Finland) Woodstock Red Devil Racing	BaBa	Mercury 2.5 V6	2	(Italy) Massimo Roggiero	1–5
(Australia) Trask Brothers Racing	GTR	Mercury 2.5 V6	3	(Australia) Bob Trask	All
(Australia) Trask Brothers Racing	GTR	Mercury 2.5 V6	4	(Australia) David Trask	All
(United Arab Emirates) Team Abu Dhabi	DAC	Mercury 2.5 V6	5	(United Arab Emirates) Thani Al Qamzi	All
(United Arab Emirates) Team Abu Dhabi	BaBa	Mercury 2.5 V6	6	(United Arab Emirates) Ahmed Al Hameli	All
(France) China CTIC Team	DAC	Mercury 2.5 V6	7	(France) Philippe Dessertenne	All
(France) China CTIC Team	DAC	Mercury 2.5 V6	8	(China) Peng Lin Wu	1
(France) China CTIC Team	DAC	Mercury 2.5 V6	8	(Sweden) Pierre Lundin	2–8
(Portugal) F1 Atlantic Team	BaBa	Mercury 2.5 V6	9	(France) Philippe Chiappe	All
(Portugal) F1 Atlantic Team	Dragon	Mercury 2.5 V6	10	(Portugal) Duarte Benavente	All
Qatar Team	DAC	Mercury 2.5 V6	11	(United States) Jay Price	All
Qatar Team	DAC	Mercury 2.5 V6	12	(Qatar) Ahmed Al Fayyad	1–4
Qatar Team	BaBa	Mercury 2.5 V6	12	(Qatar) Youssef Al Khulaifi	6–8
Qatar Team	BaBa	Mercury 2.5 V6	13	(Qatar) Youssef Al Khulaifi	1–4
Qatar Team	BaBa	Mercury 2.5 V6	13	(Qatar) Youssef Al Khulaifi	5
F1 Team Sweden	DAC	Mercury 2.5 V6	14	(Sweden) Jonas Andersson	All
F1 Team Sweden	DAC	Mercury 2.5 V6	15	(France) Philippe Toure	1, 3–4, 6–7
F1 Team Sweden	Molgaard	Mercury 2.5 V6	15	(Latvia) Uvis Slakteris	5
F1 Team Sweden	Molgaard	Mercury 2.5 V6	16	(Latvia) Uvis Slakteris	1, 3–4, 7
F1 Team Sweden	Molgaard	Mercury 2.5 V6	16	(Latvia) Uvis Slakteris	2, 6, 8
(Italy) Singha Team	DAC	Mercury 2.5 V6	23	(Italy) Marco Gambi	All
(Italy) Singha Team	Blaze	Mercury 2.5 V6	24	(Italy) Francesco Cantando	All
(Italy) Rainbow Team	DAC	Mercury 2.5 V6	31	(Norway) Marit Strømøy	1–6
(Italy) Rainbow Team	DAC	Mercury 2.5 V6	31	(Italy) Ivan Brigada	7–8
(Italy) Rainbow Team	DAC	Mercury 2.5 V6	32	(Italy) Valerio Lagiannella	1–6
(Italy) Rainbow Team	DAC	Mercury 2.5 V6	32	(Italy) Daniele Martignoni	7–8
(Italy) 800 Doctor	BaBa	Mercury 2.5 V6	70	(Italy) Fabio Comparato	All
(Italy) 800 Doctor	BaBa	Mercury 2.5 V6	77	(Germany) Fabian Kalsow	7–8
(Italy) Tamoil F1 Team	DAC	Mercury 2.5 V6	74	(Italy) Guido Cappellini	1–5, 7–8
(Italy) Tamoil F1 Team	DAC	Mercury 2.5 V6	74	(Italy) Ivan Brigada	6
(Italy) Tamoil F1 Team	DAC	Mercury 2.5 V6	75	(Russia) Stanislav Kourtsenovsky	All

Key
Regular boat/driver
Boat ineligible for team points

== Season calendar ==
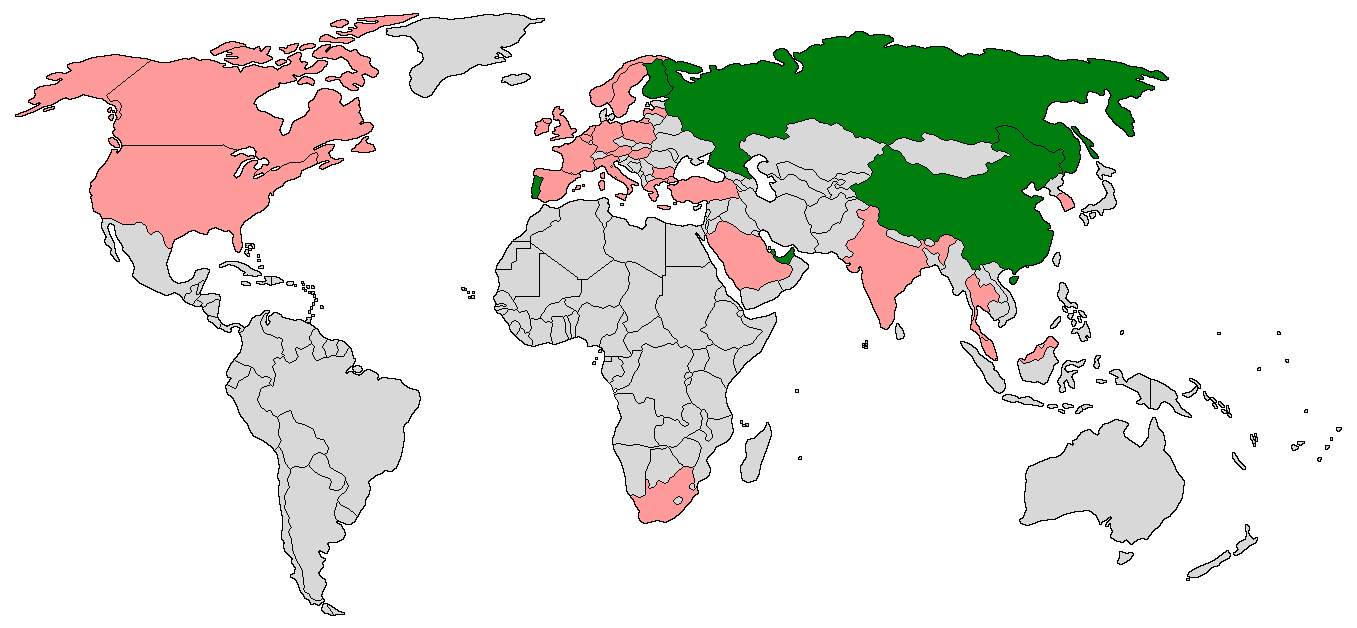
Countries that hosted F1 Powerboat races in 2008, shown in green. Former host nations are shown in pink.

Round	Race title	Date	Circuit location	Race winner	Hull/Engine
1	5th Grand Prix of Qatar	29 March	Doha	(Sweden) Jonas Andersson	DAC/Mercury
2	10th Grand Prix of Portugal	4 May	Portimão	(United States) Jay Price	DAC/Mercury
3	4th Grand Prix of Finland	8 June	Lahti	(Italy) Guido Cappellini	DAC/Mercury
4	6th Grand Prix of Russia	14 June	St Petersburg	(Sweden) Jonas Andersson	DAC/Mercury
5	8th Grand Prix of China	12 October	Liuzhou	(United States) Jay Price	DAC/Mercury
6	9th Grand Prix of China	26 October	Shenzhen	(Finland) Sami Seliö	BaBa/Mercury
7	(United Arab Emirates) 16th Grand Prix of Abu Dhabi	5 December	Abu Dhabi	(United States) Jay Price	DAC/Mercury
8	(United Arab Emirates) 9th Grand Prix of Sharjah	12 December	Sharjah	(United Arab Emirates) Thani Al Qamzi	DAC/Mercury

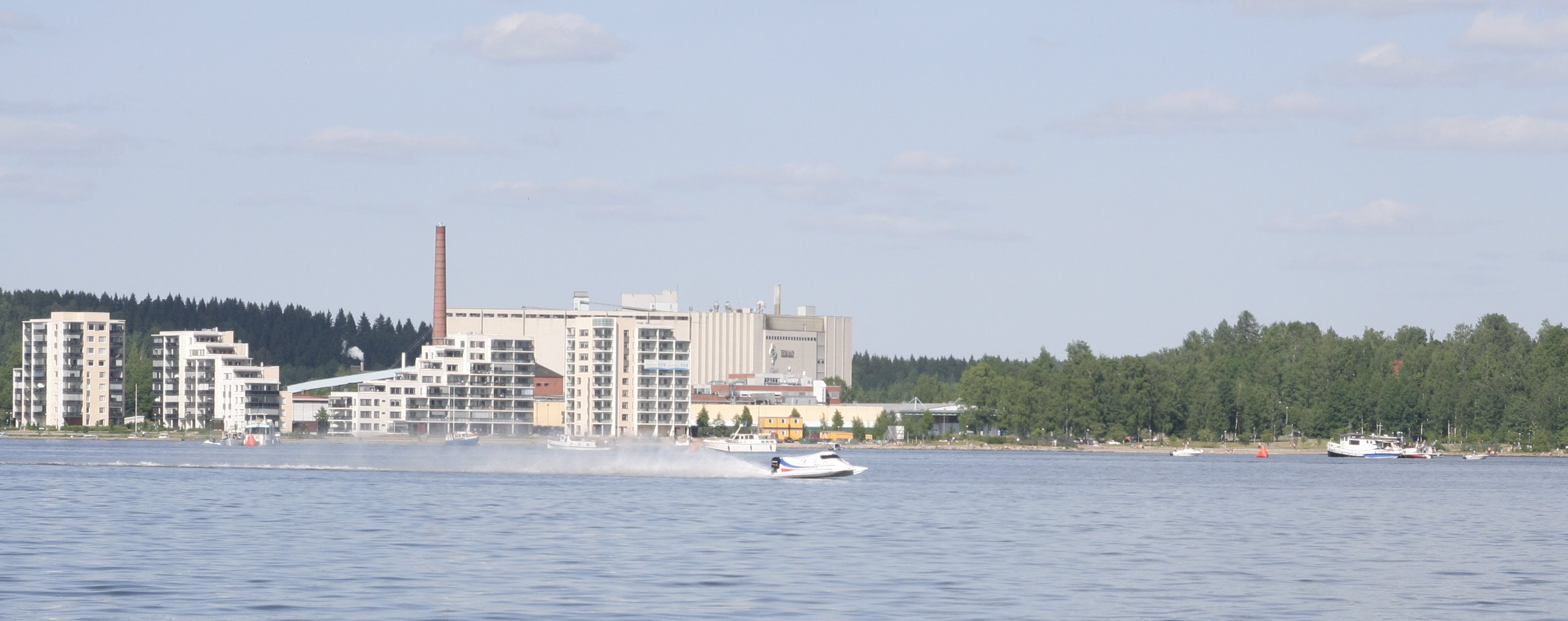
The 2008 Grand Prix of Finland, held in Lahti.

== Results and standings ==
Points were awarded to the top 10 classified finishers. A maximum of two boats per team were eligible for points in the teams' championship.

Position	**1st**	**2nd**	**3rd**	**4th**	**5th**	**6th**	**7th**	**8th**	**9th**	**10th**
Points	20	15	12	9	7	5	4	3	2	1

=== Drivers standings ===
Pos	Driver	QAT (Qatar)	POR (Portugal)	FIN (Finland)	RUS (Russia)	CHN (China)	CHN (China)	ABU (United Arab Emirates)	SHA (United Arab Emirates)	Points
1	(United States) Jay Price	2	1	2	Ret	1	2	**1**	Ret	105
2	(Finland) Sami Seliö	4	8	Ret	2	**Ret**	**1**	5	**2**	69
3	(Sweden) Jonas Andersson	**1**	Ret	Ret	1	Ret	4	10	3	62
4	(United Arab Emirates) Ahmed Al Hameli	Ret	**2**	3	10	DNS	3	2	Ret	55
5	(Italy) Fabio Comparato	Ret	5	12	3	3	Ret	8	4	43
6	(Australia) David Trask	3	Ret	Ret	6	2	Ret	4	Ret	41
7	(France) Philippe Chiappe	7	10	5	8	4	6	7	5	40
8	(United Arab Emirates) Thani Al Qamzi	Ret	Ret	Ret	Ret	Ret	Ret	3	1	32
9	(Sweden) Pierre Lundin		7	4	4	9	5	Ret	Ret	31
10	(Italy) Guido Cappellini	5	Ret	**1**	**Ret**	Ret		Ret	Ret	27
11	(Italy) Francesco Cantando	Ret	3	Ret	DNS	Ret	Ret	6	7	21
12	(France) Philippe Dessertenne	Ret	6	10	5	Ret	7	Ret	8	20
13	(Latvia) Uvis Slakteris	6	Ret	6	11	7	8	Ret	11	17
14	(Russia) Stanislav Kourtsenovsky	8	Ret	9	7	5	Ret	14	Ret	16
15	(Portugal) Duarte Benavente	Ret	4	DNS	Ret	Ret	10	Ret	9	12
16	(Australia) Bob Trask	Ret	9	7	13	8	Ret	9	Ret	11
17	(Qatar) Youssef Al Khulaifi	Ret	DNS	8	12	6	Ret	Ret	Ret	8
18	(Italy) Marco Gambi	DNS	11	Ret	9	Ret	Ret	Ret	6	7
19	(France) Philippe Tourre	9		DNS	14		DNS	Ret		2
20	(Italy) Valerio Lagiannella	DNS	Ret	DNS	Ret	Ret	9			2
21	(Italy) Ivan Brigada						DNS	12	10	1
22	(Italy) Massimo Roggiero	10	DNS	DNS	Ret	DNS				1
23	(Germany) Fabian Kalsow							11	DNS	0
24	(Italy) Daniele Martignoni							Ret	12	0
25	(Norway) Marit Strømøy	Ret	Ret	Ret	Ret	DNS	DNS			0
26	(Qatar) Ahmed Al Fayyad	Ret	DNS	Ret	Ret					0
27	(China) Peng Lin Wu	Ret								0

Key
Colour	Result
Gold	Winner
Silver	Second place
Bronze	Third place
Green	Other points position
Blue	Other classified position
Blue	Not classified, finished (NC)
Purple	Not classified, retired (Ret)
Red	Did not qualify (DNQ)
Red	Did not pre-qualify (DNPQ)
Black	Disqualified (DSQ)
White	Did not start (DNS)
White	Race cancelled (C)
Blank	Did not practice (DNP)
Blank	Excluded (EX)
Blank	Did not arrive (DNA)
Blank	Withdrawn (WD)
Blank	Did not enter (cell empty)
Text formatting	Meaning
**Bold**	Pole position
Italics	Fastest lap

=== Teams standings ===
Only boats with results eligible for points counting towards the teams' championship are shown here.

Pos	Team	Boat No.	QAT (Qatar)	POR (Portugal)	FIN (Finland)	RUS (Russia)	CHN (China)	CHN (China)	ABU (United Arab Emirates)	SHA (United Arab Emirates)	Points
1	Qatar Team	11	2	1	2	Ret	1	2	**1**	Ret	110
1	Qatar Team	12	Ret	DNS	Ret	Ret		Ret	Ret	Ret	110
1	Qatar Team	13					6				110
2	(United Arab Emirates) Team Abu Dhabi	5	Ret	Ret	Ret	Ret	Ret	Ret	3	1	87
2	(United Arab Emirates) Team Abu Dhabi	6	Ret	**2**	3	10	DNS	3	2	Ret	87
3	F1 Team Sweden	14	**1**	Ret	Ret	1	Ret	4	10	3	71
3	F1 Team Sweden	15	9		DNS	14	7		Ret		71
3	F1 Team Sweden	16		Ret				8		11	71
4	(Finland) Woodstock Red Devil Racing	1	4	8	Ret	2	**Ret**	**1**	5	**2**	70
4	(Finland) Woodstock Red Devil Racing	2	10	DNS	DNS	Ret	DNS				70
5	(Australia) Trask Brothers Racing	3	Ret	9	7	13	8	Ret	9	Ret	52
5	(Australia) Trask Brothers Racing	4	3	Ret	Ret	6	2	Ret	4	Ret	52
6	(Portugal) F1 Atlantic Team	9	7	10	5	8	4	6	7	5	52
6	(Portugal) F1 Atlantic Team	10	Ret	4	DNS	Ret	Ret	10	Ret	9	52
7	China CTIC Team	7	Ret	6	10	5	Ret	7	Ret	8	51
7	China CTIC Team	8	Ret	7	4	4	9	5	Ret	Ret	51
8	(Italy) Tamoil F1 Team	74	5	Ret	**1**	**Ret**	Ret	DNS	Ret	Ret	43
8	(Italy) Tamoil F1 Team	75	8	Ret	9	7	5	Ret	14	Ret	43
9	(Italy) 800 Doctor	70	Ret	5	12	3	3	Ret	8	4	43
9	(Italy) 800 Doctor	77							11	DNS	43
10	(Italy) Singha Team	23	DNS	11	Ret	9	Ret	Ret	Ret	6	28
10	(Italy) Singha Team	24	Ret	3	Ret	DNS	Ret	Ret	6	7	28
11	(Italy) Rainbow Team	31	Ret	Ret	Ret	Ret	DNS	DNS	12	10	3
11	(Italy) Rainbow Team	32	DNS	Ret	DNS	Ret	Ret	9	Ret	12	3

Key
Colour	Result
Gold	Winner
Silver	Second place
Bronze	Third place
Green	Other points position
Blue	Other classified position
Blue	Not classified, finished (NC)
Purple	Not classified, retired (Ret)
Red	Did not qualify (DNQ)
Red	Did not pre-qualify (DNPQ)
Black	Disqualified (DSQ)
White	Did not start (DNS)
White	Race cancelled (C)
Blank	Did not practice (DNP)
Blank	Excluded (EX)
Blank	Did not arrive (DNA)
Blank	Withdrawn (WD)
Blank	Did not enter (cell empty)
Text formatting	Meaning
**Bold**	Pole position
Italics	Fastest lap
