= 2010 F1 Powerboat World Championship =

2010 F1 Powerboat World Championship
Previous:	2009	Next:	2011

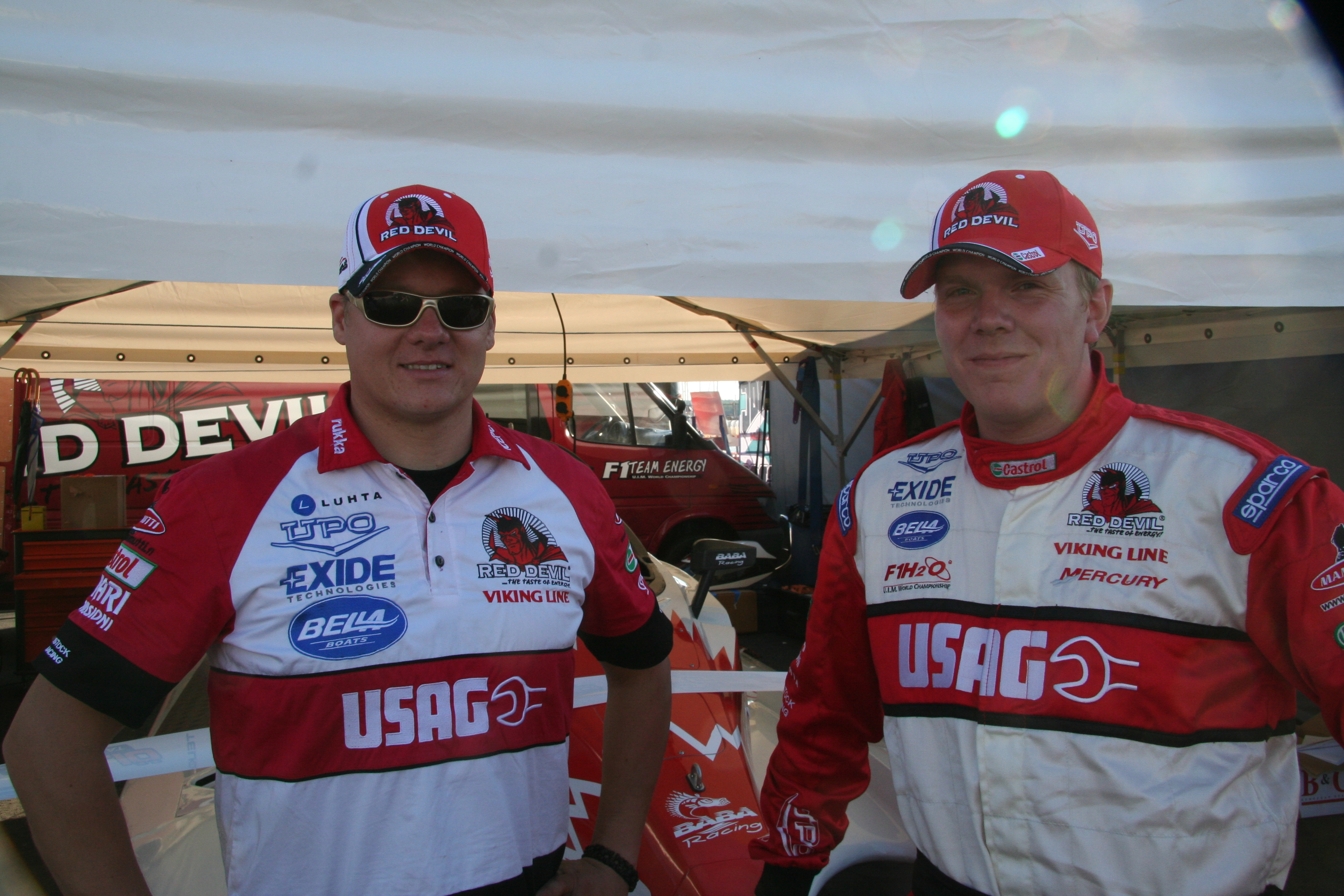
Sami Seliö (left, pictured in 2008) won his second world title in 2010.

The 2010 UIM F1 H_{2}O World Championship was the 27th season of Formula 1 Powerboat racing, and the 30th anniversary year since the series' foundation in 1981. The calendar consisted of eight races, beginning in Portimão, Portugal on 9 May 2010, and ending in Sharjah, UAE on 10 December 2010. Sami Seliö finished the season as drivers' champion driving for Team Mad Croc, clinching his second title with his first having been in 2007.

== Teams and drivers ==
Team	Hull	Engine	No.	Race drivers	Rounds
(Italy) Team Nautica	BaBa	Mercury 2.5 V6	3	(Switzerland) Rinaldo Osculati	1–2, 4–8
(Italy) Team Nautica	BaBa	Mercury 2.5 V6	4	(Slovakia) Tomas Cermak	2–8
(United Arab Emirates) Team Abu Dhabi	DAC	Mercury 2.5 V6	5	(United Arab Emirates) Thani Al Qamzi	All
(United Arab Emirates) Team Abu Dhabi	BaBa	Mercury 2.5 V6	6	(United Arab Emirates) Ahmed Al Hameli	All
(France) CTIC China Team	Moore	Mercury 2.5 V6	7	(France) Philippe Chiappe	All
(France) CTIC China Team	DAC	Mercury 2.5 V6	8	(Sweden) Pierre Lundin	All
(Portugal) F1 Atlantic Team	BaBa	Mercury 2.5 V6	9	(Germany) Fabian Kalsow	1–3
(Portugal) F1 Atlantic Team	Moore	Mercury 2.5 V6	9	(France) Philippe Tourre	4–8
(Portugal) F1 Atlantic Team	Dragon	Mercury 2.5 V6	10	(Portugal) Duarte Benavente	All
(Portugal) F1 Atlantic Team	BaBa	Mercury 2.5 V6	22	(Germany) Fabian Kalsow	6–8
(Finland) Team Mad Croc	BaBa	Mercury 2.5 V6	11	(Finland) Sami Seliö	All
(Finland) Team Mad Croc	BaBa	Mercury 2.5 V6	12	(Italy) Alex Carella	All
Team Azerbaijan	DAC	Mercury 2.5 V6	14	(Sweden) Jonas Andersson	All
Team Azerbaijan	DAC	Mercury 2.5 V6	15	(Norway) Marit Strømøy	All
Team Azerbaijan	DAC	Mercury 2.5 V6	18	(Brunei) Ma'arof Mahari	3
Qatar Team	DAC	Mercury 2.5 V6	16	(United States) Jay Price	All
Qatar Team	Dragon	Mercury 2.5 V6	17	(United Kingdom) Andy Elliott	All
(United Arab Emirates) Team Skydive Dubai	BaBa	Mercury 2.5 V6	21	(United States) Tim Seebold	3–5
(United Arab Emirates) Team Skydive Dubai	BaBa	Mercury 2.5 V6	21	(Italy) Ivan Brigada	8
(Italy) Singha F1 Racing Team	DAC	Mercury 2.5 V6	23	(Italy) Marco Gambi	1–7
(Italy) Singha F1 Racing Team	Blaze	Mercury 2.5 V6	24	(Italy) Francesco Cantando	All
(Italy) Rainbow Team	DAC	Mercury 2.5 V6	31	(Italy) Davide Padovan	All
(Italy) 800 Doctor	BaBa	Mercury 2.5 V6	69	(Italy) Luigi Roberto	2–4
(Italy) 800 Doctor	BaBa	Mercury 2.5 V6	70	(Italy) Fabio Comparato	All
(Russia) Pringles Xtreme F1 Racing	DAC	Mercury 2.5 V6	77	(Russia) Stanislav Kourtsenovsky	2

Key
Regular boat/driver
Boat ineligible for team points

== Season calendar ==
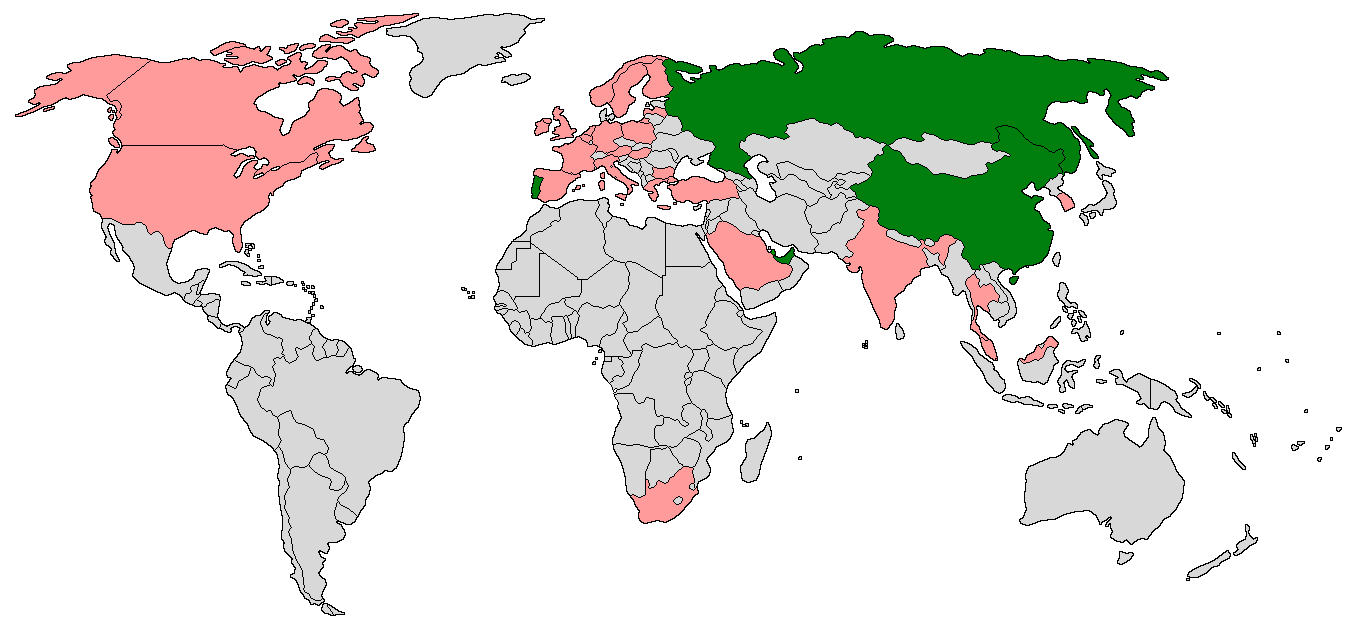
Countries that hosted F1 Powerboat races in 2010, shown in green. Former host nations are shown in pink.

A total of eight rounds comprised the 2010 championship, the same as in 2009. However the concept of running two races at each event, an idea introduced the previous year, was dropped for 2010, with the championship returning to the traditional format of practice and qualifying on the first day, and racing on the second. The Grand Prix of Finland, having been held at Lahti for the past two years, was replaced by a third Chinese race in Linyi which was announced at the beginning of the year. The initial calendar published by the UIM featured an additional race in the week following the St Petersburg event, however a location was never finalised, and it was dropped from the schedule.

Round	Race title	Date	Circuit location	Race winner	Hull/Engine
1	12th Grand Prix of Portugal	9 May	Portimão	(United Arab Emirates) Ahmed Al Hameli	BaBa/Mercury
2	8th Grand Prix of Russia	11 July	St Petersburg	(Finland) Sami Seliö	BaBa/Mercury
3	12th Grand Prix of China	3 October	Linyi	(Italy) Alex Carella	BaBa/Mercury
4	13th Grand Prix of China	17 October	Liuzhou	(United States) Jay Price	DAC/Mercury
5	14th Grand Prix of China	24 October	Shenzhen	(Italy) Francesco Cantando	Blaze/Mercury
6	7th Grand Prix of Qatar	27 November	Doha	(United States) Jay Price	DAC/Mercury
7	(United Arab Emirates) 18th Grand Prix of Abu Dhabi	4 December	Abu Dhabi	(Finland) Sami Seliö	BaBa/Mercury
8	(United Arab Emirates) 11th Grand Prix of Sharjah	10 December	Sharjah	(United Arab Emirates) Ahmed Al Hameli	BaBa/Mercury

== Results and standings ==
Points were awarded to the top 10 classified finishers. A maximum of two boats per team were eligible for points in the teams' championship.

Position	**1st**	**2nd**	**3rd**	**4th**	**5th**	**6th**	**7th**	**8th**	**9th**	**10th**
Points	20	15	12	9	7	5	4	3	2	1

=== Drivers standings ===
Pos	Driver	POR (Portugal)	RUS (Russia)	CHN (China)	CHN (China)	CHN (China)	QAT (Qatar)	ABU (United Arab Emirates)	SHA (United Arab Emirates)	Points
1	(Finland) Sami Seliö	DSQ	**1**	2	Ret	4	2	**1**	2	94
2	(United States) Jay Price	4	3	5	1	Ret	**1**	2	6	88
3	(Italy) Alex Carella	Ret	2	**1**	6	5	3	Ret	**3**	71
4	(United Arab Emirates) Thani Al Qamzi	3	4	8	2	6	6	3	5	68
5	(Italy) Francesco Cantando	**2**	Ret	3	3	1	Ret	Ret	DNS	59
6	(United Arab Emirates) Ahmed Al Hameli	1	Ret	Ret	**Ret**	**Ret**	4	4	1	58
7	(Sweden) Pierre Lundin	5	6	14	4	3	Ret	6	9	40
8	(France) Philippe Chiappe	Ret	Ret	9	Ret	2	9	5	Ret	26
9	(Sweden) Jonas Andersson	DNS	5	10	7	10	Ret	Ret	4	22
10	(Italy) Fabio Comparato	DSQ	Ret	4	10	9	10	7	DNS	17
11	(United States) Tim Seebold			6	5	7				16
12	(Germany) Fabian Kalsow	7	DNS	Ret			5	Ret	7	15
13	(Italy) Davide Padovan	8	8	Ret	9	Ret	7	9	11	14
14	(Norway) Marit Strømøy	Ret	7	DNS	Ret	8	Ret	8	8	13
15	(Portugal) Duarte Benavente	Ret	Ret	7	8	11	8	Ret	Ret	10
16	(United Kingdom) Andy Elliott	6	9	Ret	13	12	Ret	Ret	Ret	7
17	(France) Philippe Tourre				11	15	13	Ret	10	1
18	(Slovakia) Tomas Cermak		12	Ret	14	16	12	10	12	1
19	(Russia) Stanislav Kourtsenovsky		10							1
20	(Switzerland) Rinaldo Osculati	Ret	DNS		Ret	17	11	11	Ret	0
21	(Italy) Luigi Roberto		11	11	DNS					0
22	(Italy) Marco Gambi	DSQ	Ret	Ret	12	13	Ret	Ret		0
23	(Brunei) Ma'arof Mahari			12						0
24	(Italy) Ivan Brigada								Ret	0

Key
Colour	Result
Gold	Winner
Silver	Second place
Bronze	Third place
Green	Other points position
Blue	Other classified position
Blue	Not classified, finished (NC)
Purple	Not classified, retired (Ret)
Red	Did not qualify (DNQ)
Red	Did not pre-qualify (DNPQ)
Black	Disqualified (DSQ)
White	Did not start (DNS)
White	Race cancelled (C)
Blank	Did not practice (DNP)
Blank	Excluded (EX)
Blank	Did not arrive (DNA)
Blank	Withdrawn (WD)
Blank	Did not enter (cell empty)
Text formatting	Meaning
**Bold**	Pole position
Italics	Fastest lap

=== Teams standings ===
Only boats with results eligible for points counting towards the teams' championship are shown here.

Pos	Team	Boat No.	POR (Portugal)	RUS (Russia)	CHN (China)	CHN (China)	CHN (China)	QAT (Qatar)	ABU (United Arab Emirates)	SHA (United Arab Emirates)	Points
1	(Finland) Team Mad Croc	11	DSQ	**1**	2	Ret	4	2	**1**	2	165
1	(Finland) Team Mad Croc	12	Ret	2	**1**	6	5	3	Ret	**3**	165
2	(United Arab Emirates) Team Abu Dhabi	5	3	4	8	2	6	6	3	5	126
2	(United Arab Emirates) Team Abu Dhabi	6	1	Ret	Ret	**Ret**	**Ret**	4	4	1	126
3	Qatar Team	16	4	3	5	1	Ret	**1**	2	6	95
3	Qatar Team	17	6	9	Ret	13	12	Ret	Ret	Ret	95
4	(France) CTIC China Team	7	Ret	Ret	9	Ret	2	9	5	Ret	66
4	(France) CTIC China Team	8	5	6	14	4	3	Ret	6	9	66
5	(Italy) Singha F1 Racing Team	23	DSQ	Ret	Ret	12	13	Ret	Ret		59
5	(Italy) Singha F1 Racing Team	24	**2**	Ret	3	3	1	Ret	Ret	DNS	59
6	Team Azerbaijan	14	DNS	5	10	7	10	Ret	Ret	4	35
6	Team Azerbaijan	15	Ret	7	DNS	Ret	8	Ret	8	8	35
7	(Italy) 800 Doctor	69		11	11	DNS					17
7	(Italy) 800 Doctor	70	DSQ	Ret	4	10	9	10	7	DNS	17
8	(Portugal) F1 Atlantic Team	9	7	DNS	Ret	11	15	13	Ret	10	15
8	(Portugal) F1 Atlantic Team	10	Ret	Ret	7	8	11	8	Ret	Ret	15
9	(Italy) Rainbow Team	31	8	8	Ret	9	Ret	7	9	11	14
10	(United Arab Emirates) Team Skydive Dubai	21			6	5	7			Ret	11
11	(Italy) Team Nautica	3	Ret	DNS		Ret	17	11	11	Ret	1
11	(Italy) Team Nautica	4		12	Ret	14	16	12	10	12	1
12	(Russia) Pringles Xtreme F1 Racing	77		10							1

Key
Colour	Result
Gold	Winner
Silver	Second place
Bronze	Third place
Green	Other points position
Blue	Other classified position
Blue	Not classified, finished (NC)
Purple	Not classified, retired (Ret)
Red	Did not qualify (DNQ)
Red	Did not pre-qualify (DNPQ)
Black	Disqualified (DSQ)
White	Did not start (DNS)
White	Race cancelled (C)
Blank	Did not practice (DNP)
Blank	Excluded (EX)
Blank	Did not arrive (DNA)
Blank	Withdrawn (WD)
Blank	Did not enter (cell empty)
Text formatting	Meaning
**Bold**	Pole position
Italics	Fastest lap
