= 2011 F1 Powerboat World Championship =

Boat racing season

2011 F1 Powerboat World Championship
Previous:	2010	Next:	2012

The 2011 UIM F1 H_{2}O World Championship was the 28th season of Formula 1 Powerboat racing. The calendar consisted of seven races, beginning in Doha, Qatar on 5 March 2011, and ending in Sharjah, UAE on 16 December 2011. Italian Alex Carella won the Drivers' World Championship, driving for the Qatar Team.

== Teams and drivers ==
Team	Hull	Engine	No.	Race drivers	Rounds
(Italy) Mad Croc F1 Team	BaBa	Mercury 2.5 V6	1	(Finland) Sami Seliö	1–5
(Italy) Mad Croc F1 Team	BaBa	Mercury 2.5 V6	2	(Italy) Davide Padovan	All
(Italy) Mad Croc F1 Team	BaBa	Mercury 2.5 V6	19	(Kuwait) Youssef Al Rubayan	6–7
(United States) Team Nautica	BaBa	Mercury 2.5 V6	3	(Switzerland) Rinaldo Osculati	All
(United States) Team Nautica	DAC	Mercury 2.5 V6	4	(Norway) Marit Strømøy	All
(United States) Team Nautica	BaBa	Mercury 2.5 V6	18	(Poland) Bartek Marszalek	2, 4–7
(United Arab Emirates) Team Abu Dhabi	BaBa	Mercury 2.5 V6	5	(United Arab Emirates) Thani Al Qamzi	All
(United Arab Emirates) Team Abu Dhabi	BaBa	Mercury 2.5 V6	6	(United Arab Emirates) Ahmed Al Hameli	1–2, 4–7
(United Arab Emirates) Team Abu Dhabi	BaBa	Mercury 2.5 V6	6	(United States) Scott Gillman	3
CTIC China Team	Moore	Mercury 2.5 V6	7	(France) Philippe Chiappe	All
CTIC China Team	DAC	Mercury 2.5 V6	8	(Sweden) Pierre Lundin	All
(Portugal) F1 Atlantic Team	DAC	Mercury 2.5 V6	9	(France) Philippe Tourre	All
(Portugal) F1 Atlantic Team	Dragon	Mercury 2.5 V6	10	(Portugal) Duarte Benavente	All
Qatar Team	DAC	Mercury 2.5 V6	11	(United States) Jay Price	All
Qatar Team	DAC	Mercury 2.5 V6	12	(Italy) Alex Carella	All
Qatar Team	Gran Prix	Mercury 2.5 V6	13	(United States) Shaun Torrente	6–7
Team Sweden	BaBa	Mercury 2.5 V6	14	(Sweden) Jonas Andersson	All
Team Sweden	Gran Prix	Mercury 2.5 V6	15	(United States) Shaun Torrente	1–4
Team Sweden	DAC	Mercury 2.5 V6	15	(Australia) Rhys Coles	5–7
Team Sweden	BaBa	Mercury 2.5 V6	16	(Sweden) Tommy Wahlsten	5
(Italy) Singha F1 Racing Team	DAC	Mercury 2.5 V6	23	(Italy) Stefano Paoletti	1
(Italy) Singha F1 Racing Team	BaBa	Mercury 2.5 V6	23	(Italy) Ivan Brigada	2
(Italy) Singha F1 Racing Team	DAC	Mercury 2.5 V6	23	(Italy) Valerio Lagiannella	3–7
(Italy) Singha F1 Racing Team	Blaze	Mercury 2.5 V6	24	(Italy) Francesco Cantando	All
(Russia) Jetech Tool F1 Racing	DAC	Mercury 2.5 V6	77	(Russia) Stanislav Kourtsenovsky	3–4

Key
Regular boat/driver
Boat ineligible for team points

== Season calendar ==
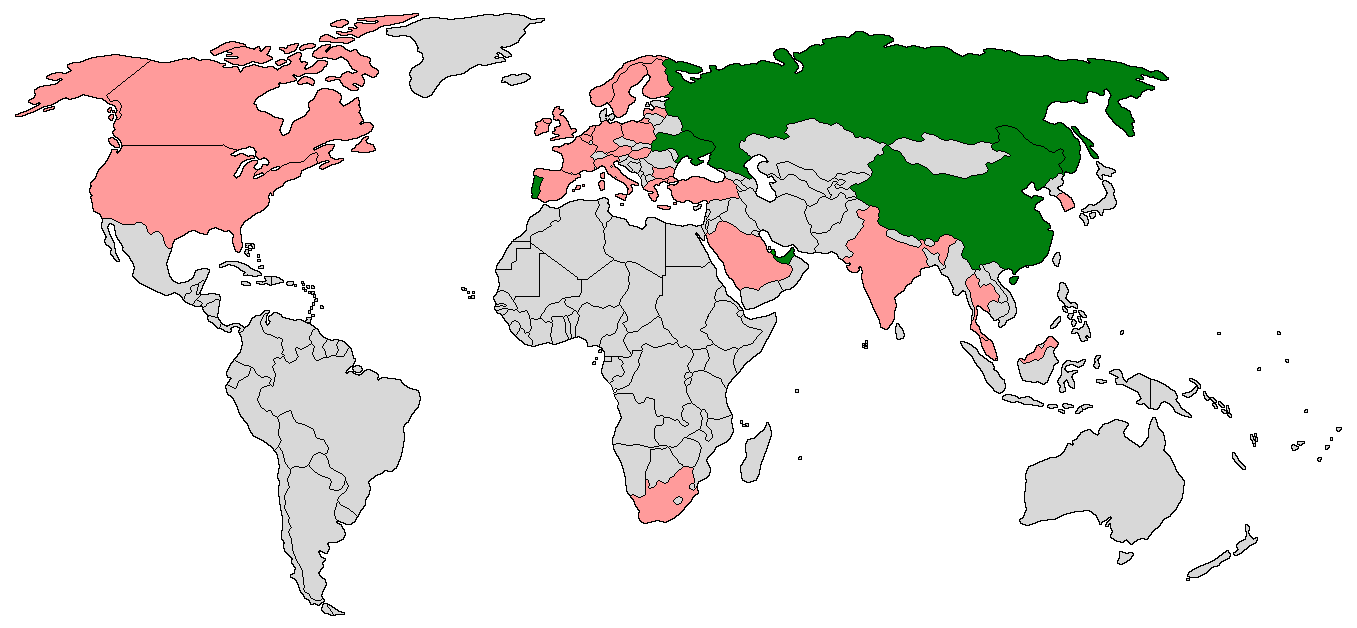
Countries that hosted F1 Powerboat races in 2011, shown in green. Former host nations are shown in pink.

There were a total of 10 individual races originally planned for the 2011 season by the UIM, with events in St Petersburg, Nanyang and Haikou alongside the seven that ultimately took place. These included a brand new race in Vyshhorod which was announced on 25 January, bringing F1 powerboats to Ukraine for the first time. However on 12 April it was announced that the planned race in St Petersburg was to be rescheduled for 2012, with the Kazan race moved back a week to avoid a clash with the Class 1 Norwegian Grand Prix.

Round	Race title	Date	Circuit location	Race winner	Hull/Engine
1	8th Grand Prix of Qatar	5 March	Doha	(United States) Jay Price	DAC/Mercury
2	13th Grand Prix of Portugal	22 May	Portimao	(United States) Jay Price	DAC/Mercury
3	(Russia) 1st Grand Prix of Tatarstan	17 July	Kazan	(Italy) Alex Carella	DAC/Mercury
4	1st Grand Prix of Ukraine	30 July	Vyshhorod	(United Arab Emirates) Ahmed Al Hameli	BaBa/Mercury
5	15th Grand Prix of China	2 October	Liuzhou	(United Arab Emirates) Thani Al Qamzi	BaBa/Mercury
6	(United Arab Emirates) 19th Grand Prix of Abu Dhabi	9 December	Abu Dhabi	(Italy) Alex Carella	DAC/Mercury
7	(United Arab Emirates) 12th Grand Prix of Sharjah	16 December	Sharjah	(United Arab Emirates) Ahmed Al Hameli	BaBa/Mercury

== Results and standings ==
Points were awarded to the top 10 classified finishers. A maximum of two boats per team were eligible for points in the teams' championship.

Position	**1st**	**2nd**	**3rd**	**4th**	**5th**	**6th**	**7th**	**8th**	**9th**	**10th**
Points	20	15	12	9	7	5	4	3	2	1

=== Drivers standings ===
Pos	Driver	QAT (Qatar)	POR (Portugal)	RUS (Russia)	UKR (Ukraine)	CHN (China)	ABU (United Arab Emirates)	SHA (United Arab Emirates)	Points
1	(Italy) Alex Carella	2	2	**1**	5	5	**1**	Ret	84
2	(United States) Jay Price	1	1	3	2	DSQ	3	Ret	79
3	(United Arab Emirates) Thani Al Qamzi	7	3	2	7	1	6	2	75
4	(United Arab Emirates) Ahmed Al Hameli	15	Ret		**1**	**2**	2	**1**	70
5	(France) Philippe Chiappe	3	9	5	9	3	Ret	3	47
6	(Italy) Francesco Cantando	9	5	8	4	6	5	4	42
7	(Finland) Sami Seliö	**14**	4	DNS	3	Ret			21
8	(Italy) Davide Padovan	6	6	Ret	DNS	4	Ret	9	21
9	(Sweden) Jonas Andersson	5	Ret	Ret	6	Ret	7	8	19
10	(United States) Shaun Torrente	4	Ret	Ret	Ret		Ret	5	16
11	(Sweden) Pierre Lundin	11	Ret	Ret	8	7	4	Ret	16
12	(Portugal) Duarte Benavente	10	7	Ret	12	8	8	6	16
13	(United States) Scott Gillman			4					9
14	(Norway) Marit Strømøy	8	**Ret**	6	Ret	Ret	10	DSQ	9
15	(Australia) Rhys Coles					10	11	7	5
16	(France) Philippe Tourre	DNS	8	9	11	DNS	DNS	Ret	5
17	(Russia) Stanislav Kourtsenovsky			7	Ret				4
18	(Kuwait) Youssef Al Rubayan						9	11	2
19	(Sweden) Tommy Wahlsten					9			2
20	(Switzerland) Rinaldo Osculati	12	11	10	14	Ret	Ret	DNS	1
21	(Poland) Bartek Marszalek		12		10	Ret	Ret	DNS	1
22	(Italy) Valerio Lagiannella			DNS	13	DNS	Ret	10	1
23	(Italy) Ivan Brigada		10						1
24	(Italy) Stefano Paoletti	13							0

Key
Colour	Result
Gold	Winner
Silver	Second place
Bronze	Third place
Green	Other points position
Blue	Other classified position
Blue	Not classified, finished (NC)
Purple	Not classified, retired (Ret)
Red	Did not qualify (DNQ)
Red	Did not pre-qualify (DNPQ)
Black	Disqualified (DSQ)
White	Did not start (DNS)
White	Race cancelled (C)
Blank	Did not practice (DNP)
Blank	Excluded (EX)
Blank	Did not arrive (DNA)
Blank	Withdrawn (WD)
Blank	Did not enter (cell empty)
Text formatting	Meaning
**Bold**	Pole position
Italics	Fastest lap

=== Teams standings ===
Only boats with results eligible for points counting towards the teams' championship are shown here.

Pos	Team	Boat No.	QAT (Qatar)	POR (Portugal)	RUS (Russia)	UKR (Ukraine)	CHN (China)	ABU (United Arab Emirates)	SHA (United Arab Emirates)	Points
1	Qatar Team	11	1	1	3	2	DSQ	3	Ret	172
1	Qatar Team	12	2	2	**1**	5	5	**1**	Ret	172
2	(United Arab Emirates) Team Abu Dhabi	5	7	3	2	7	1	6	2	154
2	(United Arab Emirates) Team Abu Dhabi	6	15	Ret	4	**1**	**2**	2	**1**	154
3	CTIC China Team	7	3	9	5	9	3	Ret	3	63
3	CTIC China Team	8	11	Ret	Ret	8	7	4	Ret	63
4	(Italy) Mad Croc F1 Team	1	**14**	4	DNS	3	Ret			44
4	(Italy) Mad Croc F1 Team	2	6	6	Ret	DNS	4	Ret	9	44
4	(Italy) Mad Croc F1 Team	19						9	11	44
5	(Italy) Singha F1 Racing Team	23	13	10	DNS	13	DNS	Ret	10	44
5	(Italy) Singha F1 Racing Team	24	9	5	8	4	6	5	4	44
6	Team Sweden	14	5	Ret	Ret	6	Ret	7	8	24
6	Team Sweden	15	4	Ret	Ret	Ret	10	11	7	24
7	(Portugal) F1 Atlantic Team	9	DNS	8	9	11	DNS	DNS	Ret	21
7	(Portugal) F1 Atlantic Team	10	10	7	Ret	12	8	8	6	21
8	(United States) Team Nautica	3	12	11	10	14	Ret	Ret	DNS	10
8	(United States) Team Nautica	4	8	**Ret**	6	Ret	Ret	10	DSQ	10
9	(Russia) Jetech Tool F1 Racing	77			7	Ret				4

Key
Colour	Result
Gold	Winner
Silver	Second place
Bronze	Third place
Green	Other points position
Blue	Other classified position
Blue	Not classified, finished (NC)
Purple	Not classified, retired (Ret)
Red	Did not qualify (DNQ)
Red	Did not pre-qualify (DNPQ)
Black	Disqualified (DSQ)
White	Did not start (DNS)
White	Race cancelled (C)
Blank	Did not practice (DNP)
Blank	Excluded (EX)
Blank	Did not arrive (DNA)
Blank	Withdrawn (WD)
Blank	Did not enter (cell empty)
Text formatting	Meaning
**Bold**	Pole position
Italics	Fastest lap
