= Class 1 World Powerboat Championship =

Motorboat racing competition

Class One USA
- Category: Twin 1100hp engine Catamaran
- Country: Worldwide
- Inaugural season: 1964
- Engine suppliers: Mercury Marine Racing division
- Teams' champion: 2019 Champion Team Victory Team Driver: Eisa Al Ali Throttle-man: Salem Al Adidi
- Official website: P1Offshore.com

The UIM Class 1 World Powerboat Championship (also known as Class 1) is an international offshore powerboat racing category organized by the Union Internationale Motonautique (UIM). The series features catamarans competing in multi-event seasons sanctioned by the UIM.

The championship was established in 1964, following the development of modern offshore powerboat racing in the mid-20th century. It has operated under both single-event and multi-event formats, and now runs as a season-long points competition. Class 1 boats are composite catamarans powered by standardized high-output engines and crewed by a driver and throttle man. World Championship titles are awarded based on cumulative race results across each season.

== History ==
The earliest recorded race was held in 1887 in Nice, France, and was organized by the Paris Sailing Club.

Two further races were recorded in 1903 in France: a 62-mile race in Meulan on the River Seine, organized by the Poissy Sailing Club, and a second race covering 230 miles from Paris to Trouville.

Offshore powerboat racing expanded following the Miami–Nassau race in 1956, which led to the introduction of the Sam Griffith Memorial Trophy, and in 1964, the establishment of a UIM-sanctioned offshore World Championship for Class 1 boats.

From 1964 to 1976, the championship used a multi-race points system. From 1977 to 1991, it was decided at a single end-of-season event consisting of multiple races. In 1992, the championship returned to a multi-event format.

As of the 2019 season, a Class One USA category was introduced within the APBA Offshore Championship Series, featuring catamarans powered by twin 9.0-litre Mercury Racing 1100 Competition V8 stern-drive engines as a spec power unit.

In the inaugural 2019 Class One USA season, the Dubai-based Victory Team (Victory 3, crewed by Salem Al Adidi and Eisa Al Ali) secured the overall title at the Roar Offshore Fort Myers event, winning the APBA Offshore Championship Series crown.

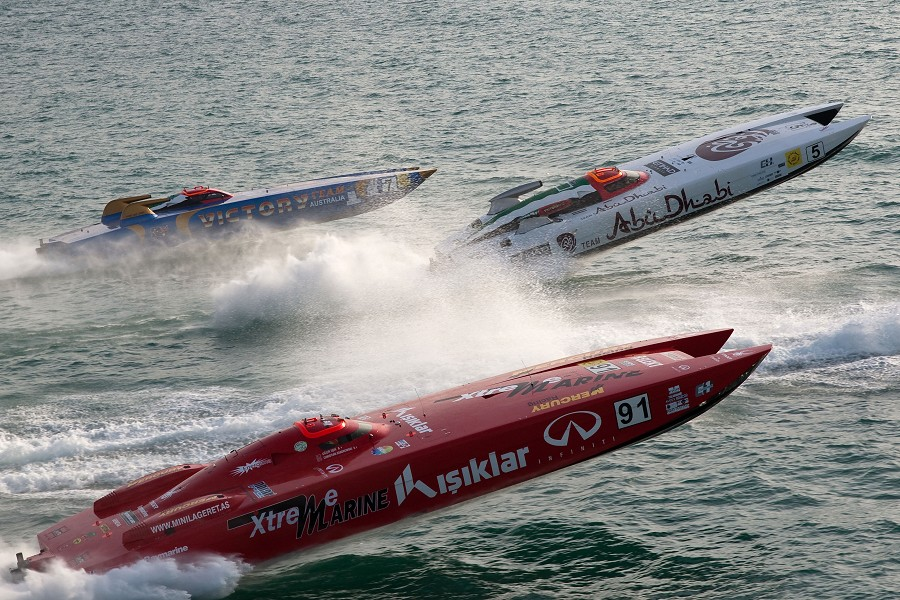
Class 1 Grand Prix Dubai 2012

== Class 1 Boats ==
Class 1 offshore race boats are catamarans measuring between 12 and 14 meters (39.4–45.9 ft) in length, with a beam of approximately 3.5 meters (11.5 ft). They are constructed from composite materials such as carbon fiber and Kevlar, which are commonly used in marine applications for their structural strength and weight characteristics.

Under current regulations, Class 1 catamarans must meet a minimum weight of 4,950 kg (4.95 metric tons). All competing boats use twin Mercury Racing 9.0-litre 1100 Competition V8 stern-drive engines as the mandatory spec power unit, producing a combined output of 2,200 horsepower. These engines allow Class 1 boats to exceed speeds of approximately 257 km/h (160 mph) under favorable conditions.

The cockpit incorporates reinforced crash structures designed to protect the crew during high-speed impacts, and includes safety features such as canopies, impact-resistant seating, and an escape hatch in the hull. Onboard instrumentation typically includes GPS navigation, trim indicators, and engine management displays, which the crew uses to monitor performance during competition.

Two crew members operate a Class 1 race boat: a driver and a throttle man. The driver is responsible for steering the boat and selecting the racing line, while the throttleman manages engine power, trim settings, and balance to optimize performance in varying sea conditions.

Both crew members wear specialized safety equipment, including impact-resistant helmets, flotation devices, and harness systems compliant with offshore racing regulations. Safety protocols require the crew to complete approved training and demonstrate familiarity with emergency procedures before competition.

== The Championship ==
A Class 1 season consists of a series Grands Prix, made up of three official practice sessions, one official qualifying session (known as the pole position session), and two races. The results of each race are combined to determine the winner of the World Championship. The European Championship and the Middle East Championship are defined by specific events in those geographic regions. The results in official qualifying determine the winner of the Pole Position Championship.

Eight races at four venues make up the UIM Class 1 World Powerboat Championship, with races run over approximately 55 or 75 nautical miles (Nm) consisting of multiple laps of approximately 5 Nm (including one or two mandatory long laps).

The World Championship title is awarded based on a cumulative points system. Points are distributed for each race as follows:

- 1st Place: 20 points
- 2nd Place: 15 points
- 3rd Place: 12 points
- 4th Place: 9 points
- 5th Place: 7 points

A Grand Prix weekend takes place over three days, with registration, technical scrutineering, the first practice session and driver briefings held on day one.

On day two, a practice session is run in the morning, followed immediately by the pole position session (which also counts as a separate championship), and Race 1 in the afternoon.

The pole position session, like the practice sessions, is held on the Grand Prix course. It allows teams to assess circuit conditions and make technical adjustments to their boat setup. It acts as the qualifier for the line-up for Race 1, with the pole-sitter (fastest time) lining up closest to the official start boat. The session lasts for 45 minutes; teams must complete a minimum of one timed lap and are allowed to return to the wet pits to make setup adjustments, but are limited to a total of 10 minutes of crane time.

On day three, a final practice session in the morning is followed in the afternoon by Race 2. Each race is started by an official pace boat that runs at a controlled speed and leads the boats from the wet pits into a line-abreast formation under a yellow flag or amber flashing light. A green flag denotes the start of the race. The finishing order from the pole position session determines the line-up for Race 1, and the finishing order of Race 1 determining the start order for Race 2.

Each race consists of approximately 11–15 laps and is 55–75 Nm in length, including one or two mandatory long laps.

== Winners ==
Edition	Year	Driver	Hull	Motor
1	1964	(United States) Jim Wynne	Wynne	Daytona
2	1965	(United States) Richard Bertram	Bertram	Detroit Diesel
3	1966	(United States) Jim Wynne	Wynne	Daytona
4	1967	(United States) Don Aronow – (United States) Norris House	Magnum	Mercruiser
5	1968	(Italy) Vincenzo Balestrieri – (United States) Don Pruett	Magnum	Mercruiser
6	1969	(United States) Don Aronow – (United States) Norris House	Cary	Mercruiser
7	1970	(Italy) Vincenzo Balestrieri – (United States) Jack Stuteville	Cary	Mercruiser
8	1971	(United States) William Wishnick – (United States) Robert Moore	Cigarette	Mercruiser
9	1972	(United States) Bobby Rautbord – (United States) Robert Moore	Cigarette	Mercruiser
10	1973	(Italy) Carlo Bonomi – (United States) Richie Powers	Cigarette	Aeromarine
11	1974	(Italy) Carlo Bonomi – (United States) Richie Powers	Cigarette	Aeromarine
12	1975	(Brazil) Wallace Franz – (United States) Robert Moore	Bertram	Aeromarine
13	1976	(United States) Tom Gentry – (United States) Richie Powers	Cigarette	Aeromarine
14	1977	(United States) Betty Cook – (United States) John Connor	Scarab	Mercruiser
15	1978	(Italy) Francesco Cosentino – (Italy) Alberto Diridoni	Picchiotti	Mercruiser
16	1979	(United States) Betty Cook – (United States) John Connor	Cougar	Mercruiser
17	1980	(United States) Michael Meynard – (United States) Robert Idoni	Cougar	Mercruiser
18	1981	(United States) Jerry Jacoby – (United States) Keith Hazell	Cigarette	Hawk
19	1982	(Italy) Renato Della Valle – (Monaco) Gianfranco Rossi	CUV	Mercruiser
20	1983	(United States) Tony Garcia – (United States) Keith Hazell	Cougar	Rahilly Grady
21	1984	(Italy) Alberto Petri – (Italy) Franco Statua	CUV	Mercruiser
22	1985	(United States) A.J. Roberts – (United Kingdom) Steve Curtis	Cougar	KS & W
23	1986	(Italy) Antonio Gioffredi – (Italy) Giovanni di Meglio	Buzzi	Aifo Iveco
24	1987	(United Kingdom) Steve Curtis – (United States) W. Falcon	Cougar	KS & W
25	1988	(Italy) Fabio Buzzi – (Italy) Romeo Ferraris	Buzzi	Seatek
26	1989	(Italy) Stefano Casiraghi – (Italy) Romeo Ferraris	Buzzi	Seatek
27	1990	not awarded		
28	1991	(Italy) Angelo Spelta – (Italy) Maurizio Ambrogetti	CUV	Isotta Fraschini
29	1992	(Italy) Walter Ragazzi – (Finland) Jukka Mattila	Skater	Lightning
30	1993	(United Arab Emirates) Khalfan Harib – (United States) Ed Colyer	Victory	Sterling
31	1994	(Italy) Norberto Ferretti – (Italy) Luca Ferrari	Tencara	Lamborghini
32	1995	(United Arab Emirates) Saeed Al Tayer – (Puerto Rico) Felix Serralles	Victory	Sterling
33	1996	(United Arab Emirates) Saeed Al Tayer – (Puerto Rico) Felix Serralles	Victory	Sterling
34	1997	(Saudi Arabia) Laith Pharaon – (United States) John Tomlinson	Tencara	Lamborghini
35	1998	(Norway) Bjørn Rune Gjelsten – (United Kingdom) Steve Curtis	Tencara	Lamborghini
36	1999	(United Arab Emirates) Ali Nasser – (United States) Randy Scism	Victory	Sterling
37	2000	(United Arab Emirates) Ali Nasser – (United Arab Emirates) Khalfan Harib	Victory	Steak
38	2001	(United Arab Emirates) Mohammed Al Marri – (United Arab Emirates) Saeed Al Tayer	Victory	Lamborghini
39	2002	(Norway) Bjørn Rune Gjelsten – (United Kingdom) Steve Curtis	Tencara	Lamborghini
40	2003	(Norway) Bjørn Rune Gjelsten – (United Kingdom) Steve Curtis	Victory	Lamborghini
41	2004	(Norway) Bjørn Rune Gjelsten – (United Kingdom) Steve Curtis	Victory	Lamborghini
42	2005	(Norway) Bård Eker – (United Kingdom) Steve Curtis	Victory	Lamborghini
43	2006	(Norway) Bjørn Rune Gjelsten – (United Kingdom) Steve Curtis	Victory	Lamborghini
44	2007	(United Arab Emirates) Arif Saif Al Zafeen – (France) Jean-Marc Sanchez	Victory	Lamborghini
45	2008	(United Arab Emirates) Mohammed Al Marri – (United Arab Emirates) Nadir Bin Hendi	Victory	Victory
46	2009	(United Arab Emirates) Arif Saif Al Zafeen – (United Arab Emirates) Nadir Bin Hendi	Victory	Victory
47	2010	(United Arab Emirates) Arif Saif Al Zafeen – (United Arab Emirates) Nadir Bin Hendi	Victory	Victory
48	2011	(United Arab Emirates) Arif Saif Al Zafeen – (United Arab Emirates) Nadir Bin Hendi	Victory	Victory
49	2012	(United Arab Emirates) Arif Saif Al Zafeen – (United Arab Emirates) M. Al Marri	Victory	Victory
50	2013	(United Arab Emirates) Arif Saif Al Zafeen – (United Arab Emirates) M. Al Marri	Victory	Victory
51	2014	(United Arab Emirates) Arif Saif Al Zafeen – (United Arab Emirates) N. Bin Hendi	Victory	Victory
52	2015	(United States) Gary Ballough – (United States) John Tomlinson	MTI	Mercury Racing
53	2016	(United Arab Emirates) Arif Saf Al-Zafeen – (United Arab Emirates) Nadir Bin Hendi	Victory Team	Victory V12
54	2017	(United Arab Emirates) Eisa Al Ali – (United Arab Emirates) Salem Al Aldidi	Victory Team	
55	2018	(United States) Shaun Torrente – (United Arab Emirates) Faleh Al-Mansoori	Team Abu Dhabi 4	
56	2019	(United Arab Emirates) Eisa Al Ali – (United Arab Emirates) Salem Al Aldidi	Victory	Mercury Racing
57	2021	(United Arab Emirates) Arif Saif Al-Zafeen – (United Arab Emirates) Nadir Bin Hendi	Dubai Police	
58	2022	(United States) Travis Pastrana – (United Kingdom) Steve Curtis	Huski Racing	
59	2023	(Italy) Giovanni Carpitella – (Australia) Darren Nicholson		
60	2024	(United States) Tyler Miller – (United States) Myrick Coil		
