= 2015 F1 Powerboat World Championship =

International motorboat racing competition

2015 F1 Powerboat World Championship
Previous:	2014	Next:	2016

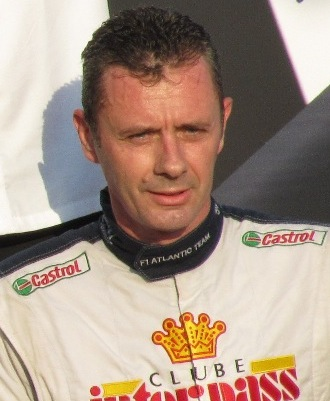
Philippe Chiappe (pictured in 2009) successfully defended his world title.

The 2015 UIM F1 H_{2}O World Championship was the 32nd season of Formula 1 Powerboat racing. The season consisted of six races, beginning in Doha, Qatar, on 14 March 2015, and ending in Sharjah, UAE, on 18 December 2015.

Philippe Chiappe, driving for the CTIC China Team, entered the season as defending world champion having won his first title, and the first for a Frenchman, the previous year. Chiappe successfully defended his title, securing enough points at the penultimate round in Abu Dhabi and thus became the series' fourth back-to-back championship winner. In addition, the championship witnessed its first ever female race winner, when Marit Strømøy won the final round at Sharjah, with the occasion attracting international media coverage.

== Teams and drivers ==
Team	Hull	Engine	No.	Race drivers	Rounds
CTIC China Team	Moore	Mercury 2.5 V6	1	(France) Philippe Chiappe	All
CTIC China Team	Moore	Mercury 2.5 V6	2	(China) Xiong Ziwei	All
Qatar Team	DAC	Mercury 2.5 V6	4	(United States) Shaun Torrente	1
(United Arab Emirates) Team Abu Dhabi	DAC	Mercury 2.5 V6	5	(Italy) David Del Pin	1–2
(United Arab Emirates) Team Abu Dhabi	DAC	Mercury 2.5 V6	5	(United Arab Emirates) Thani Al Qamzi	3–6
(United Arab Emirates) Team Abu Dhabi	DAC	Mercury 2.5 V6	6	(Italy) Alex Carella	All
(Portugal) F1 GC Atlantic Team	DAC	Mercury 2.5 V6	9	(Kuwait) Youssef Al Rubayan	All
(Portugal) F1 GC Atlantic Team	Moore	Mercury 2.5 V6	10	(Portugal) Duarte Benavente	All
(Italy) Mad Croc BaBa Racing Team	BaBa	Mercury 2.5 V6	11	(Finland) Sami Seliö	All
(Italy) Mad Croc BaBa Racing Team	BaBa	Mercury 2.5 V6	12	(Finland) Filip Roms	All
Team Sweden	Molgaard	Mercury 2.5 V6	14	(Sweden) Jonas Andersson	All
Team Sweden	Molgaard	Mercury 2.5 V6	15	(Sweden) Jesper Forss	All
(Italy) Motorglass F1 Team	DAC	Mercury 2.5 V6	18	(Poland) Bartek Marszalek	2–6
(Italy) Motorglass F1 Team	DAC	Mercury 2.5 V6	23	(Austria) Bernd Enzenhofer	1–5
(Italy) Motorglass F1 Team	Blaze	Mercury 2.5 V6	24	(Italy) Francesco Cantando	All
(United Arab Emirates) Emirates Team	BaBa	Mercury 2.5 V6	27	(United Arab Emirates) Ahmed Al Hameli	All
(United Arab Emirates) Emirates Team	DAC	Mercury 2.5 V6	28	(Sweden) Erik Stark	2–6
(United States) Team Nautica (United Arab Emirates) Team EMIC	BaBa	Mercury 2.5 V6	50	(Norway) Marit Strømøy	All
(United States) Team Nautica (United Arab Emirates) Team EMIC	DAC	Mercury 2.5 V6	51	(Sweden) Erik Stark	1
(United States) Team Nautica (United Arab Emirates) Team EMIC	Moore	Mercury 2.5 V6	51	(France) Christophe Larigot	2–6
(France) Maverick Racing	DAC	Mercury 2.5 V6	73	(France) Cédric Deguisne	2–3
(United Arab Emirates) Victory Team	BaBa; Victory	Mercury 2.5 V6	77	(United States) Shaun Torrente	2–6
(United Arab Emirates) Victory Team	BaBa; Victory	Mercury 2.5 V6	78	(United Arab Emirates) Nadir Bin Hendi	3–6

Key
Regular boat/driver
Boat ineligible for team points

=== Team and driver changes ===
The 2015 season would see the biggest team and driver changes for some time, as sporting and political decisions upset the balance of recent years. By far the most significant development was the Qatar Team's withdrawal from the sport following a merger between the Qatar Sailing Federation and Qatar Marine Sports Federation (QMSF); the latter of the two bodies having previously run the Qatar F1H2O operation. The team ran a single boat at the opening race on home waters in Doha for Shaun Torrente, with former teammate and triple world champion Alex Carella having already left for bitter rivals Team Abu Dhabi.

Carella had been tempted to switch teams after manoeuvres behind the scenes at Team Abu Dhabi resulted in Guido Cappellini replacing Scott Gillman as the team's technical director. But whilst Torrente won the opening race of the year for the Qatar Team, by June the squad had been shut down, and Torrente instead joined forces with the widely respected offshore outfit Victory Team, who now turned their attention to the inshore scene. At the third race of the year in Porto, Torrente was joined by reigning Class 1 and X-Cat champion Nadir Bin Hendi, making his debut in the series. Initially, both Victory pilots used customer BaBa hulls, but the team were unsatisfied with their performance and looked to source a supply of Moore boats which were being campaigned successfully by the CTIC China team. Moore refused to supply Victory however, preferring to keep exclusivity with their fellow French-based China team. Denied, Victory went and built their own hulls which were ready by the Abu Dhabi GP, where the new self-titled Victory hulls made their debut. It was noted however that the new boats bore somewhat of a resemblance to their Moore counterparts.

At Team Abu Dhabi Carella was initially partnered with Thani Al Qamzi, but on 13 March, the day before the season-opening Qatar GP, Al Qamzi and new team principal Cappellini had a bitter argument over which boat the driver should use. The outcome resulted in Al Qamzi being sacked from the team, and at the eleventh hour was replaced by Italian rookie David Del Pin. After the second round in France however, Del Pin was demoted to reserve driver and Al Qamzi returned to Team Abu Dhabi in time for the third race in Portugal.

Having been replaced by Carella, Ahmed Al Hameli was left on the sidelines but joined up with ousted principal Scott Gillman. Having been sacked, Gillman took his organisation Gillman Racing and renamed it Emirates Team. This forced Cappellini and the rest of the Team Abu Dhabi management to lodge an entirely new entry as Abu Dhabi had been effectively title-sponsoring Gillman Racing previously. Returning to how he began his team in the 1990s prior to Abu Dhabi involvement, Gillman described his new venture as aiming to "nurture Emirati talent". For the first race of the year, with no F1 hull readily available at such short notice, Gillman and Al Hameli had to source an F2 boat – Ivan Brigada's BaBa from the previous year – replacing the smaller capacity F2 engine for an F1-standard one. By the second round of the year, the team had new BaBa hulls ready to race, and alongside Al Hameli, Erik Stark was signed from Team Nautica. Considered one of the sport's brightest prospects, Stark had finished sixth in the 2014 championship, and backed the performance up with a third-place finish in the first race of 2015. Stark was replaced at Team Nautica by Frenchman Christophe Larigot, making his debut in F1, and prior to the French GP, Nautica announced they would be changing their team name to Team EMIC, at the same time switching from racing under the American flag, to the Emirati one.

Brigada's former employers Caudwell Racing did not return for 2015, having folded last year without completing the season. This left Brigada and Slovakia's Tomáš Čermák without drives and ensured that the field returned to being entirely powered by 2.5 litre two stroke Mercury engines.

Reigning champions CTIC China Team retained their line-up of Philippe Chiappe and Xiong Ziwei, and F1 GC Atlantic Team, Mad Croc BaBa Racing and Team Sweden, also all named unchanged line-ups from 2014. Francesco Cantando's Motorglass F1 Team saw a change as Austrian Bernd Enzenhofer joined, whilst Bartek Marszalek skipped the first race in Qatar and rejoined the team from the French GP. France also saw the entry of another new team alongside Victory, with French team Maverick Racing running Cédric Deguisne, who returned to the sport after a ten-year absence. Maverick competed in just the French and Portuguese rounds and did not travel with the rest of the teams for the remaining races outside of Europe.

== Season calendar ==
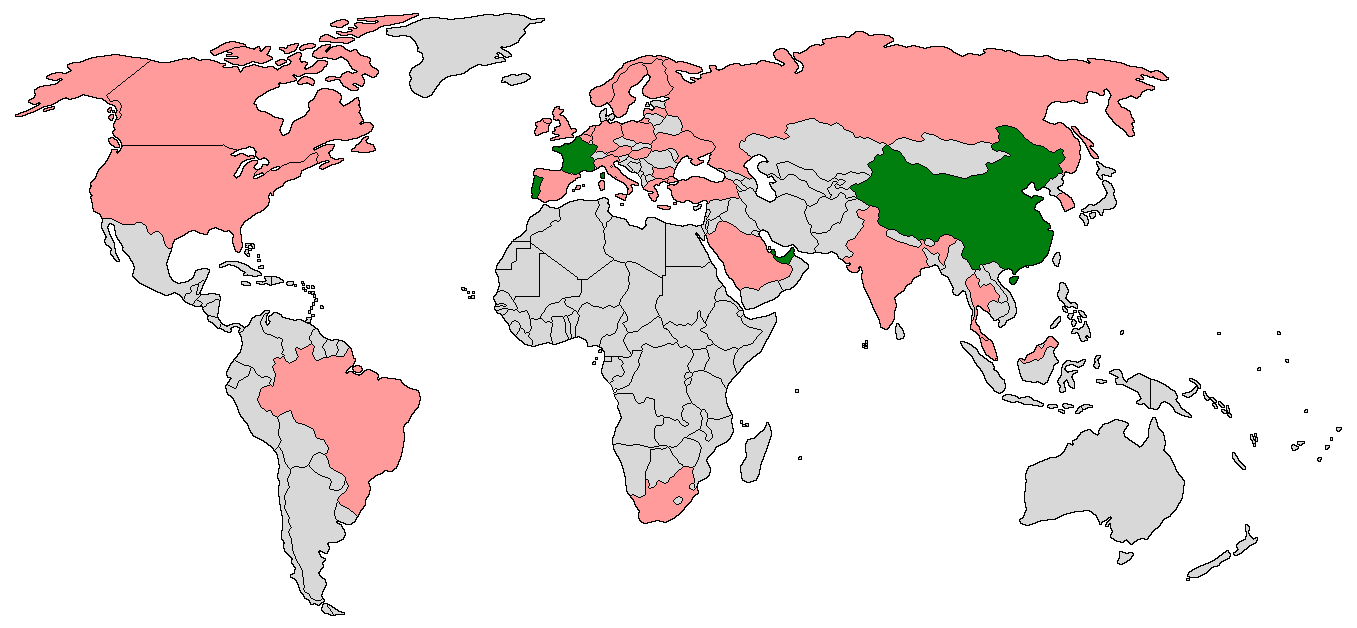
Countries that hosted F1 Powerboat races in 2015, shown in green. Former host nations are shown in pink.

A provisional calendar of eight races was released by the UIM on 24 January 2015, the largest since 2010 and featuring two races in Europe for the first time since the 2011 season when Portimao and Kyiv appeared. Portugal returned after a four-year absence, whilst France appeared on the calendar for the first time since 2007, an eight-year gap. The French race featured as a consequence of Chiappe's title success in 2014. Qatar returned to a single slot having filled in for the cancelled Ukraine round in 2014 with an additional race, whilst the traditional end-of-year double header in the UAE continued at Abu Dhabi and Sharjah. An additional race in China at Shanghai was initially planned alongside regular venue Liuzhou, however this race was later cancelled in August. Another race that was planned and subsequently cancelled was a visit to Thailand, in what would have seen the series return to the country for the first time since 1994. With the two cancellations, the calendar reverted to six races over the course of the year.

Round	Race title	Date	Circuit location	Race winner	Hull/engine
1	12th Grand Prix of Qatar	14 March	Doha	(United States) Shaun Torrente	DAC/Mercury
2	19th Grand Prix of France	28 June	Évian-les-Bains	(Kuwait) Youssef Al Rubayan	DAC/Mercury
3	14th Grand Prix of Portugal	2 August	Porto	(France) Philippe Chiappe	Moore/Mercury
4	19th Grand Prix of China	2 October	Liuzhou	(France) Philippe Chiappe	Moore/Mercury
5	(United Arab Emirates) 23rd Grand Prix of Abu Dhabi	11 December	Abu Dhabi	(Italy) Alex Carella	DAC/Mercury
6	(United Arab Emirates) 16th Grand Prix of Sharjah	18 December	Sharjah	(Norway) Marit Strømøy	BaBa/Mercury

== Results and standings ==
Points were awarded to the top 10 classified finishers. A maximum of two boats per team were eligible for points in the teams' championship.

Position	**1st**	**2nd**	**3rd**	**4th**	**5th**	**6th**	**7th**	**8th**	**9th**	**10th**
Points	20	15	12	9	7	5	4	3	2	1

=== Drivers standings ===
Pos	Driver	QAT (Qatar)	FRA (France)	POR (Portugal)	CHN (China)	ABU (United Arab Emirates)	SHA (United Arab Emirates)	Points
1	(France) Philippe Chiappe	2	**Ret**	1	**1**	2	Ret	70
2	(Italy) Alex Carella	5	DSQ	3	Ret	**1**	2	54
3	(United States) Shaun Torrente	**1**	4	5	8	Ret	3	51
4	(Kuwait) Youssef Al Rubayan	7	1	8	4	9	Ret	38
5	(Norway) Marit Strømøy	6	10	DNS	5	6	1	38
6	(Sweden) Erik Stark	3	Ret	2	DNS	Ret	**4**	36
7	(Finland) Sami Seliö	Ret	5	**Ret**	3	4	5	35
8	(Sweden) Jonas Andersson	4	2	Ret	6	Ret	6	34
9	(United Arab Emirates) Thani Al Qamzi			6	2	3	Ret	32
10	(Finland) Filip Roms	8	3	7	11	Ret	Ret	19
11	(United Arab Emirates) Ahmed Al Hameli	Ret	Ret	10	Ret	5	7	12
12	(Sweden) Jesper Forss	Ret	6	DNS	9	DNS	8	10
13	(Italy) Francesco Cantando	Ret	Ret	4	Ret	Ret	Ret	9
14	(Portugal) Duarte Benavente	10	Ret	Ret	7	7	Ret	9
15	(Poland) Bartek Marszalek		7	11	DNS	8	Ret	7
16	(France) Christophe Larigot		9	9	12	10	10	6
17	(France) Cédric Deguisne		8	Ret				3
18	(United Arab Emirates) Nadir Bin Hendi			Ret	DNS	Ret	9	2
19	(Italy) David Del Pin	9	DNS					2
20	(China) Xiong Ziwei	11	11	Ret	10	Ret	Ret	1
21	(Austria) Bernd Enzenhofer	DNS	DNS	DNS	13	DNS		0

Key
Colour	Result
Gold	Winner
Silver	Second place
Bronze	Third place
Green	Other points position
Blue	Other classified position
Blue	Not classified, finished (NC)
Purple	Not classified, retired (Ret)
Red	Did not qualify (DNQ)
Red	Did not pre-qualify (DNPQ)
Black	Disqualified (DSQ)
White	Did not start (DNS)
White	Race cancelled (C)
Blank	Did not practice (DNP)
Blank	Excluded (EX)
Blank	Did not arrive (DNA)
Blank	Withdrawn (WD)
Blank	Did not enter (cell empty)
Text formatting	Meaning
**Bold**	Pole position
Italics	Fastest lap

=== Teams standings ===
Only boats with results eligible for points counting towards the teams' championship are shown here.

Pos	Team	Boat No.	QAT (Qatar)	FRA (France)	POR (Portugal)	CHN (China)	ABU (United Arab Emirates)	SHA (United Arab Emirates)	Points
1	(United Arab Emirates) Team Abu Dhabi	5	9	DNS	6	2	3	Ret	88
1	(United Arab Emirates) Team Abu Dhabi	6	5	DSQ	3	Ret	**1**	2	88
2	CTIC China Team	1	2	**Ret**	1	**1**	2	Ret	71
2	CTIC China Team	2	11	11	Ret	10	Ret	Ret	71
3	(United States) Team Nautica (United Arab Emirates) Team EMIC	50	6	10	DNS	5	6	1	56
3	(United States) Team Nautica (United Arab Emirates) Team EMIC	51	3	9	9	12	10	10	56
4	(Italy) Mad Croc BaBa Racing Team	11	Ret	5	**Ret**	3	4	5	54
4	(Italy) Mad Croc BaBa Racing Team	12	8	3	7	11	Ret	Ret	54
5	(Portugal) F1 GC Atlantic Team	9	7	1	8	4	9	Ret	47
5	(Portugal) F1 GC Atlantic Team	10	10	Ret	Ret	7	7	Ret	47
6	Team Sweden	14	4	2	Ret	6	Ret	6	44
6	Team Sweden	15	Ret	6	DNS	9	DNS	8	44
7	(United Arab Emirates) Emirates Team	27	Ret	Ret	10	Ret	5	7	36
7	(United Arab Emirates) Emirates Team	28		Ret	2	DNS	Ret	**4**	36
8	(United Arab Emirates) Victory Team	77		4	5	8	Ret	3	33
8	(United Arab Emirates) Victory Team	78			Ret	DNS	Ret	9	33
9	Qatar Team	4	**1**						20
10	(Italy) Motorglass F1 Team	23	DNS	DNS	DNS	13	DNS		9
10	(Italy) Motorglass F1 Team	24	Ret	Ret	4	Ret	Ret	Ret	9
11	(France) Maverick Racing	73		8	Ret				3

Key
Colour	Result
Gold	Winner
Silver	Second place
Bronze	Third place
Green	Other points position
Blue	Other classified position
Blue	Not classified, finished (NC)
Purple	Not classified, retired (Ret)
Red	Did not qualify (DNQ)
Red	Did not pre-qualify (DNPQ)
Black	Disqualified (DSQ)
White	Did not start (DNS)
White	Race cancelled (C)
Blank	Did not practice (DNP)
Blank	Excluded (EX)
Blank	Did not arrive (DNA)
Blank	Withdrawn (WD)
Blank	Did not enter (cell empty)
Text formatting	Meaning
**Bold**	Pole position
Italics	Fastest lap
