= Forward Drive =

A "forward drive" is a form of marine propulsion that uses forward-facing counter-rotating props to pull the boat through water rather than pushing it, with an undisturbed water flow to the propellers. The engine sits just forward of the transom while the drive unit (outdrive or drive leg) lies outside the hull.

Volvo Penta holds a US patent for the Forward Drive.

== Operation ==
The drive unit transmits power from the inboard engine, generally mounted above the waterline, outboard through the transom and downward to the propellers below the waterline. The propellers lie about 27 inches further forward than the props of a Duoprop and move from an exposed position beyond the transom to underneath the hull, away from people in the water. This causes the thrust to be multi-directional rather than bi-directional. The exhaust exits under the water. The engine can be trimmed up and down which equates to less wetted area.

== Characteristics ==
The claimed advantages of forward drive propulsion include safety, versatility, fuel economy, comfort and environmental care.

It is proposed for water sports like wakesurfing and wakeboarding, as well as swimming, diving and fishing behind the boat.

Two claimed benefits are the enhanced performance and powertrim. Variable trim angles provide the right thrust for leisure cruising as well as top speeds.

== History ==
The patent for forward drive was filed by Volvo Penta In 2017, by Volvo Penta's former president Ron Huibers and his engineering team. Designed with forward-facing propellers tucked under the boat away from the swimming platform, the forward drive would allow Volvo Penta’s customers to build boats for the growing watersports market.

== See also ==
- Sterndrive
