= Thomas Gentry =

Thomas or Tom Gentry may refer to:

- Thomas G. Gentry, American educator, ornithologist, naturalist and animal rights writer
- Tom Gentry (politician), American attorney and politician
- Tom Gentry (offshore powerboat racer), American millionaire and offshore powerboat racer
