= Formula (boats) =

Brand of pleasure boats produced in the US

- Type: Private company
- Industry: Motorboat
- Founded: Miami, Florida, United States (1962)
- Founder: Don Aronow
- Headquarters: Decatur, Indiana, U.S.
- Area served: Worldwide
- Website: FormulaBoats.com

Formula Boat is a brand of pleasure boats produced in Miami, Florida, United States, having its headquarters at Decatur, Indiana, and sold globally. Thunderbird Products owns and operates the Formula brand.

== History ==
In 1956, John "Woody" Woodson began experimenting with fiberglass technology to create 14- and 16-foot runabout boats called the Thunderbird with Richard C. Cole as his principal designer. Cole pioneered the use of the cathedral hull, making the first successful sterndrive crossing from Miami to Nassau in a Thunderbird in 1959. In 1961, Merrick Lewis bought Thunderbird. Merrick Lewis did not know much about boats, so he hired Richard "Dick" Genth as a salesman. Dick and Merrick believed the best way to promote Thunderbird was to participate in the new sport of offshore racing. Dick began racing and earned a name for himself and Thunderbird boats.

In 1964, Alliance Machine purchased Thunderbird and changed the name to Thunderbird/Formula, hoping this addition to their offshore racing team would also be successful. The racing scene soon proved expensive, and Fuqua Industries bought Thunderbird/Formula in 1969.

=== Formula Marine ===
A competitive and athletic World War 2 merchant marine veteran, powerboat racer Don Aronow would found the first of several boat companies on NE 188th Street in North Miami Beach, Formula Marine, in 1963.

Racing his first Miami-Nassau race in 1962, Aronow was instantly hooked on powerboat racing, and saw a winning formula with partners Dave Stirrat, Jim Wynne, Walt Walters, Buddy Smith, and Jake Trotter, naming his company Formula after this partnership.

The original 233 deep-V hull design was the first successful model, and its influence is present in today's models.

Aronow would sell Formula and all but one of his molds to Alliance Machine Company in 1964 in what would become a pattern, whereupon he would sign a non-compete clause, walk out the door, and start Donzi Marine right next door.

=== Vic Porter ===
Vic Porter was an entrepreneur who experienced great success in mobile home sales, real estate, and boat sales. After a few years as a salesman, Porter believed he could build better models of boats than he was currently selling.

In 1958, Vic Porter founded Duo Incorporated and started his career as a boat builder with his first 14-foot twin outboard-powered catamaran. Porter's boats became popular, and in 1963 Duo Incorporated was crafting 20 boats per week. In 1966, his sales revenue was over one million dollars.

After much success, Vic Porter sold Duo Incorporated to Bangor Punta in 1967. In 1970, Porter stepped away from his role as President of Duo Incorporated to begin Signa Corporation in Decatur, Indiana. Signa Corporation began producing sterndrive and outboard-powered tri-hull runabouts. Thanks to Porter's reputation, Signa quickly became successful as it marketed boats in the Midwest and East.

Signa's success attracted the attention of Fuqua Industries, which owned Thunderbird/Formula. Fuqua Industries purchased Signa in 1973, and Vic Porter became the president of Thunderbird/Formula/Signa.

After a few years as President of both companies, Vic Porter started Porter Inc. and purchased Thunderbird/Formula/Signa. Then in 1979, the company canceled the Signa lineup, and the brand became Thunderbird/Formula. Porter developed the Formula deep-V series of caddies and the Formula 302 LS high-performance offshore model during this same year. The Formula name continued to grow in popularity among the boating community due to many innovative designs.

== Overview ==
Formula's main headquarters are in Decatur, Indiana, and manufactures 16 models of fast boats.

Formula Boats has won many construction and performance awards through its many years in business. In 2001 and 2002, Formula won the Mercury Constructor's Cup. The 370 Super Sport and the Formula 400 Super Sport won Powerboat Sport Cruiser of the Year in 2004 and 2005. In 2006, the Formula 240 Bowrider won Powerboat Magazine's "Boat of the Year."

Formula Boats are also renowned for their racing history. In 1985, Scott Porter raced the 302 SR-1 "Secret Formula" to win the Southeast Divisional Championship. Boats from the Formula catalog won the World Championships for the American Power Boat Association in 2003. A Formula-sponsored Unlimited Hydroplane won first place in the American Boat Racing Association's National High Points race in 2006.
