= 2016 World Championship =

2016 World Championship may refer to:

- 2016 FINA World Swimming Championships (25 m)
- 2016 IAAF World Indoor Championships
- 2016 Men's Bandy World Championship
- 2016 Women's Bandy World Championship
- 2016 Men's World Open Squash Championship
- 2016 Women's World Team Squash Championships
- 2016 World Indoor Bowls Championship
- 2016 World Rowing Championships

Cycling

- 2016 UCI BMX World Championships
- 2016 UCI Cyclo-cross World Championships
- 2016 UCI Road World Championships
- 2016 UCI Track Cycling World Championships

Motorsports

- 2016 FIA Formula One World Championship
- 2016 FIA World Endurance Championship
- 2016 FIA World Rally Championship
- 2016 FIA World Rallycross Championship
- 2016 FIA World Touring Car Championship
- 2016 F1 Powerboat World Championship
- 2016 Red Bull Air Race World Championship

Winter sports

- 2016 World Ringette Championships
- 2016 Biathlon World Championship
- 2016 FIBT Bobsleigh and Skeleton World Championships
- 2016 FIL World Luge Championships
- 2016 World Men's Curling Championship
- 2016 World Women's Curling Championship
- 2016 Men's World Ice Hockey Championships
- 2016 Women's Ice Hockey World Championships
- 2016 World Allround Speed Skating Championships
- 2016 World Figure Skating Championships
- 2016 World Short Track Speed Skating Championships
- 2016 World Single Distance Speed Skating Championships
- 2016 World Sprint Speed Skating Championships

== See also ==
- 2016 World Cup (disambiguation)
