= 2017 F1 Powerboat World Championship =

2017 F1 Powerboat World Championship
| Previous: | 2016 | Next: | 2018 |

The 2017 UIM F1 H_{2}O World Championship was the 34th season of Formula 1 Powerboat racing. An initial seven race calendar was released at the end of January, with the championship scheduled to begin in Portimão, Portugal on 23 April and conclude in Sharjah, UAE on 15 December.

Philippe Chiappe, driving for the CTIC F1 Shenzhen China Team, enters the season as defending triple world champion having in 2016 become only the third driver in the sport's history to win three back-to-back drivers' championships. However, Chiappe's streak as champion was ended by Italy's Alex Carella for the Team Abu Dhabi, who secured his fourth drivers' championship.

== Teams and drivers ==
| Team | Hull | Engine | No. | Race drivers | Rounds | Reserve driver(s) |
|---|---|---|---|---|---|---|
| CTIC F1 Shenzhen China | Moore | Mercury 2.5 V6 | 1 | (France) Philippe Chiappe | All | (China) Xiong Ziwei (France) Nelson Morin |
| CTIC F1 Shenzhen China | Moore | Mercury 2.5 V6 | 2 | (France) Peter Morin | All | (China) Xiong Ziwei (France) Nelson Morin |
| (United Arab Emirates) Victory Team | BaBa | Mercury 2.5 V6 | 3 | (United Arab Emirates) Ahmed Al Hameli | All | |
| (United Arab Emirates) Victory Team | Moore | Mercury 2.5 V6 | 4 | (United States) Shaun Torrente | All | |
| (United Arab Emirates) Team Abu Dhabi | DAC | Mercury 2.5 V6 | 5 | (United Arab Emirates) Thani Al Qamzi | All | |
| (United Arab Emirates) Team Abu Dhabi | DAC | Mercury 2.5 V6 | 6 | (Italy) Alex Carella | All | |
| (United Arab Emirates) Team Abu Dhabi | DAC | Mercury 2.5 V6 | 7 | (United Arab Emirates) Rashed Al Qamzi | All | |
| (Portugal) F1 Atlantic Team | DAC | Mercury 2.5 V6 | 9 | (Australia) Grant Trask | All | (Germany) Stefan Hagin |
| (Portugal) F1 Atlantic Team | Moore | Mercury 2.5 V6 | 10 | (Portugal) Duarte Benavente | All | (Germany) Stefan Hagin |
| (Italy) Mad-Croc BaBa Racing | BaBa | Mercury 2.5 V6 | 11 | (Finland) Sami Seliö | All | (Netherlands) Ferdinand Zandbergen |
| (Italy) Mad-Croc BaBa Racing | BaBa | Mercury 2.5 V6 | 12 | (Finland) Filip Roms | All | (Netherlands) Ferdinand Zandbergen |
| Team Sweden | Molgaard | Mercury 2.5 V6 | 14 | (Sweden) Jonas Andersson | All | |
| Team Sweden | DAC | Mercury 2.5 V6 | 15 | (Sweden) Erik Stark | All | |
| Team Sweden | DAC | Mercury 2.5 V6 | 16 | (Sweden) Erik Edin | 5–6 | |
| (Italy) Blaze Performance | DAC | Mercury 2.5 V6 | 23 | (Poland) Bartek Marszalek | All | (Italy) Roberto Lo Piano |
| (Italy) Blaze Performance | Blaze | Mercury 2.5 V6 | 24 | (Italy) Francesco Cantando | All | (Italy) Roberto Lo Piano |
| (United Arab Emirates) Emirates Racing Team | BaBa | Mercury 2.5 V6 | 50 | (Norway) Marit Strømøy | All | |
| (United Arab Emirates) Emirates Racing Team | DAC | Mercury 2.5 V6 | 51 | (Germany) Mike Szymura | All | |
| (United Arab Emirates) Emirates Racing Team | Dragon | Mercury 2.5 V6 | 77 | (United Kingdom) Matthew Palfreyman | 5–6 | |
| (France) Maverick F1 | DAC | Mercury 2.5 V6 | 70 | (France) Beranger Robart | 2, 6 | |
| (France) Maverick F1 | Moore | Mercury 2.5 V6 | 73 | (France) Cédric Deguisne | All | |
| (France) Maverick F1 | Moore | Mercury 2.5 V6 | 74 | (France) Amaury Jousseaume | 1–5 | |

=== Team and driver changes ===
The biggest change prior to the 2017 season getting underway was Scott Gillman's takeover of the management of the Victory Team. There had been doubt since the end of 2016 about the outfit's participation for the following season until Gillman was unveiled as the new team manager a month prior to the first race of the year in Portugal. Shaun Torrente was retained and paired with Ahmed Al Hameli. Gillman's existing Emirates Racing team had initially appeared to sign Australian Grant Trask who had impressed in his two outings at the end of 2016, and was slated to be replacing Swedish driver Erik Stark. However it later transpired that Trask's hiring had been misreported and that Gillman was in fact moving Marit Strømøy and Mike Szymura from the EMIC Racing Team, which would close for 2017, into his Emirates Racing outfit.

Consequently Trask was correctly revealed as an F1 Atlantic driver, replacing Christophe Larigot at Duarte Benavente's team, while Stark rejoined fellow Swede Jonas Andersson's Team Sweden outfit, with which he had made his debut in the series back in 2012.

Having run three boats at the final round of 2016, Team Abu Dhabi boss Guido Cappellini confirmed that all three of his drivers at the Sharjah race - Alex Carella, Thani Al Qamzi and Rashed Al Qamzi - would be retained in full time drives for 2017. While at reigning champions CTIC China, Xiong Ziwei was replaced by Frenchman Peter Morin who had been the team's reserve driver the previous year. The change was effectively a straight swap, with Ziwei assuming the reserve driver position for 2017 alongside Nelson Morin.

After entering the European races for the past two seasons, Cédric Deguisne's Maverick F1 team assumed a full-time entry for the 2017 season, and hired fellow Frenchman Amaury Jousseaume to make his series debut as the team's second driver. At their home race in Évian, the young team expanded with a third boat for debutant Beranger Robart, bringing the number of French drivers on the grid to five.

== Season calendar ==
A seven-race preliminary calendar for the 2017 championship was revealed in a press release on the sport's official website in January. This maintained the same number of races as in 2016, however the Grand Prix of Dubai did not return, with the Portuguese round moving to season opener for the first time since 2010. As well as Portugal, the French round was also retained and the European leg will be followed by two races in China, with one initially confirmed in Harbin and a second confirmed later in the year at regular venue Liuzhou. The fifth race of the year was scheduled to be held in Asia in November, but this event was removed midway through the season in a familiar pattern to previous years. This subsequently reduced the calendar to six races. The season will be concluded with the traditional two races in the UAE in Abu Dhabi and Sharjah.

| Round | Race title | Date | Circuit location | Race winner | Hull/Engine |
|---|---|---|---|---|---|
| 1 | 16th Grand Prix of Portugal | 23 April | Portimão | (France) Philippe Chiappe | Moore/Mercury |
| 2 | 21st Grand Prix of France | 2 July | Évian-les-Bains | (Italy) Alex Carella | DAC/Mercury |
| 3 | 21st Grand Prix of China | 13 August | Harbin | (Sweden) Erik Stark | DAC/Mercury |
| 4 | 22nd Grand Prix of China | 1 October | Liuzhou | (Italy) Alex Carella | DAC/Mercury |
| 5 | (United Arab Emirates) 25th Grand Prix of Abu Dhabi | 8 December | Abu Dhabi | (France) Philippe Chiappe | Moore/Mercury |
| 6 | (United Arab Emirates) 18th Grand Prix of Sharjah | 15 December | Sharjah | (Italy) Alex Carella | DAC/Mercury |

== Results and standings ==
Points are awarded to the top 10 classified finishers. A maximum of two boats per team are eligible for points in the teams' championship.

| Position | **1st** | **2nd** | **3rd** | **4th** | **5th** | **6th** | **7th** | **8th** | **9th** | **10th** |
| Points | 20 | 15 | 12 | 9 | 7 | 5 | 4 | 3 | 2 | 1 |

=== Drivers standings ===
| Pos | Driver | POR (Portugal) | FRA (France) | CHN (China) | CHN (China) | ABU (United Arab Emirates) | SHA (United Arab Emirates) | Points |
|---|---|---|---|---|---|---|---|---|
| 1 | (Italy) Alex Carella | 4 | **1** | 4 | **1** | 3 | **1** | 90 |
| 2 | (France) Philippe Chiappe | 1 | Ret | 5 | 3 | **1** | 4 | 68 |
| 3 | (Sweden) Erik Stark | 8 | 7 | **1** | 2 | 5 | Ret | 49 |
| 4 | (United Arab Emirates) Thani Al Qamzi | DNS | 6 | 2 | 6 | 7 | 3 | 41 |
| 5 | (Sweden) Jonas Andersson | Ret | 5 | 6 | Ret | 6 | 2 | 32 |
| 6 | (Finland) Sami Seliö | 2 | 2 | Ret | 14 | DNS | DNS | 30 |
| 7 | (United Arab Emirates) Ahmed Al Hameli | DNS | 4 | 3 | 4 | 11 | Ret | 30 |
| 8 | (United States) Shaun Torrente | **Ret** | 3 | Ret | 5 | 4 | Ret | 28 |
| 9 | (Norway) Marit Strømøy | Ret | 8 | DSQ | Ret | 2 | 8 | 21 |
| 10 | (Poland) Bartek Marszalek | 5 | Ret | 7 | 8 | DNS | 5 | 21 |
| 11 | (Portugal) Duarte Benavente | 3 | 9 | Ret | Ret | 14 | 10 | 15 |
| 12 | (France) Peter Morin | 9 | 11 | 10 | 12 | 9 | 6 | 10 |
| 13 | (Australia) Grant Trask | 7 | Ret | 12 | 13 | 10 | 7 | 9 |
| 14 | (Finland) Filip Roms | Ret | Ret | 8 | 9 | 8 | Ret | 8 |
| 15 | (France) Cedric Deguisne | 6 | 14 | 9 | 16 | Ret | Ret | 7 |
| 16 | (Germany) Mike Szymura | DSQ | Ret | 13 | 7 | Ret | Ret | 4 |
| 17 | (United Arab Emirates) Rashed Al Qamzi | DNS | 12 | 11 | 11 | 12 | 9 | 2 |
| 18 | (Italy) Francesco Cantando | Ret | 10 | Ret | 10 | Ret | Ret | 2 |
| 19 | (France) Amaury Jousseaume | Ret | 13 | Ret | 15 | Ret | | 0 |
| | (France) Beranger Robart | | Ret | | | | DNS | 0 |
| | (Sweden) Erik Edin | | | | | DNS | 11 | 0 |
| | (United Kingdom) Matthew Palfreyman | | | | | DNS | Ret | 0 |

Key
| Colour | Result |
|---|---|
| Gold | Winner |
| Silver | Second place |
| Bronze | Third place |
| Green | Other points position |
| Blue | Other classified position |
| Blue | Not classified, finished (NC) |
| Purple | Not classified, retired (Ret) |
| Red | Did not qualify (DNQ) |
| Red | Did not pre-qualify (DNPQ) |
| Black | Disqualified (DSQ) |
| White | Did not start (DNS) |
| White | Race cancelled (C) |
| Blank | Did not practice (DNP) |
| Blank | Excluded (EX) |
| Blank | Did not arrive (DNA) |
| Blank | Withdrawn (WD) |
| Blank | Did not enter (cell empty) |
| Text formatting | Meaning |
| **Bold** | Pole position |
| Italics | Fastest lap |

=== Teams standings ===
Only boats with results eligible for points counting towards the teams' championship are shown here.

| Pos | Team | Boat No. | POR (Portugal) | FRA (France) | CHN (China) | CHN (China) | ABU (United Arab Emirates) | SHA (United Arab Emirates) | Points |
|---|---|---|---|---|---|---|---|---|---|
| 1 | (United Arab Emirates) Team Abu Dhabi | 5 | DNS | 6 | 2 | 6 | 7 | 3 | 131 |
| 1 | (United Arab Emirates) Team Abu Dhabi | 6 | 4 | **1** | 4 | **1** | 3 | **1** | 131 |
| 2 | Team Sweden | 14 | Ret | 5 | 6 | Ret | 6 | 2 | 81 |
| 2 | Team Sweden | 15 | 8 | 7 | **1** | 2 | 5 | Ret | 81 |
| 3 | CTIC F1 Shenzhen China | 1 | 1 | Ret | 5 | 3 | **1** | 4 | 78 |
| 3 | CTIC F1 Shenzhen China | 2 | 9 | 11 | 10 | 12 | 9 | 6 | 78 |
| 4 | (United Arab Emirates) Victory Team | 3 | DNS | 4 | 3 | 4 | 11 | Ret | 58 |
| 4 | (United Arab Emirates) Victory Team | 4 | **Ret** | 3 | Ret | 5 | 4 | Ret | 58 |
| 5 | (Italy) Mad-Croc BaBa Racing | 11 | 2 | 2 | Ret | 14 | DNS | DNS | 38 |
| 5 | (Italy) Mad-Croc BaBa Racing | 12 | Ret | Ret | 8 | 9 | 8 | Ret | 38 |
| 6 | (United Arab Emirates) Emirates Racing Team | 50 | Ret | 8 | DSQ | Ret | 2 | 8 | 25 |
| 6 | (United Arab Emirates) Emirates Racing Team | 51 | DSQ | Ret | 13 | 7 | Ret | Ret | 25 |
| 7 | (Portugal) F1 Atlantic Team | 9 | 7 | Ret | 12 | 13 | 10 | 7 | 24 |
| 7 | (Portugal) F1 Atlantic Team | 10 | 3 | 9 | Ret | Ret | 14 | 10 | 24 |
| 8 | (Italy) Blaze Performance | 23 | 5 | Ret | 7 | 8 | DNS | 5 | 23 |
| 8 | (Italy) Blaze Performance | 24 | Ret | 10 | Ret | 10 | Ret | Ret | 23 |
| 9 | (France) Maverick F1 | 73 | 6 | 14 | 9 | 16 | Ret | Ret | 7 |
| 9 | (France) Maverick F1 | 74 | Ret | 13 | Ret | 15 | Ret | | 7 |

Key
| Colour | Result |
|---|---|
| Gold | Winner |
| Silver | Second place |
| Bronze | Third place |
| Green | Other points position |
| Blue | Other classified position |
| Blue | Not classified, finished (NC) |
| Purple | Not classified, retired (Ret) |
| Red | Did not qualify (DNQ) |
| Red | Did not pre-qualify (DNPQ) |
| Black | Disqualified (DSQ) |
| White | Did not start (DNS) |
| White | Race cancelled (C) |
| Blank | Did not practice (DNP) |
| Blank | Excluded (EX) |
| Blank | Did not arrive (DNA) |
| Blank | Withdrawn (WD) |
| Blank | Did not enter (cell empty) |
| Text formatting | Meaning |
| **Bold** | Pole position |
| Italics | Fastest lap |
