= 2016 F1 Powerboat World Championship =

2016 F1 Powerboat World Championship
Previous:	2015	Next:	2017

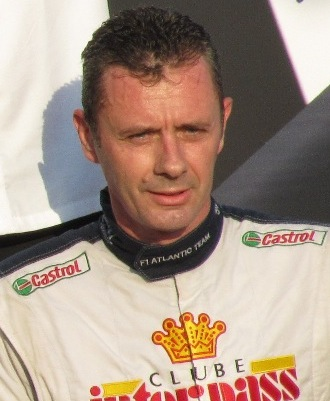
Philippe Chiappe (pictured in 2009) won his third championship.

The 2016 UIM F1 H_{2}O World Championship was the 33rd season of Formula 1 Powerboat racing. The season consisted of seven races, beginning in Dubai, UAE on 4 March 2016, and ending in Sharjah, UAE on 16 December 2016, although initial plans indicated a ten race calendar.

Philippe Chiappe, driving for the CTIC F1 Shenzhen China Team, entered the season as defending double world champion and successfully retained his title to become only the third driver in the sport's history to win three back-to-back drivers' championships. In addition, Chiappe's CTIC F1 Shenzhen China Team clinched their first teams' championship. Both the BRM Pole Position Trophy and Fast Lap Trophy were also won by Chiappe.

== Teams and drivers ==
Team	Hull	Engine	No.	Race drivers	Rounds	Reserve driver
CTIC F1 Shenzhen China Team	Moore	Mercury 2.5 V6	1	(France) Philippe Chiappe	All	(France) Peter Morin
CTIC F1 Shenzhen China Team	Moore	Mercury 2.5 V6	2	(China) Xiong Ziwei	All	(France) Peter Morin
(United Arab Emirates) Victory Team	Victory; Moore	Mercury 2.5 V6	3	(United Arab Emirates) Nadir Bin Hendi	All	
(United Arab Emirates) Victory Team	Victory; Moore	Mercury 2.5 V6	4	(United States) Shaun Torrente	All	
(United Arab Emirates) Team Abu Dhabi	DAC	Mercury 2.5 V6	5	(United Arab Emirates) Thani Al Qamzi	All	
(United Arab Emirates) Team Abu Dhabi	DAC	Mercury 2.5 V6	6	(Italy) Alex Carella	All	
(United Arab Emirates) Team Abu Dhabi	DAC	Mercury 2.5 V6	7	(United Arab Emirates) Rashed Al Qamzi	7	
(Portugal) F1 Atlantic Team	DAC; Moore	Mercury 2.5 V6	9	(France) Christophe Larigot	All	
(Portugal) F1 Atlantic Team	Moore	Mercury 2.5 V6	10	(Portugal) Duarte Benavente	All	
(Italy) Mad-Croc BaBa Racing	BaBa	Mercury 2.5 V6	11	(Finland) Sami Seliö	All	(South Africa) Wynand de Jager
(Italy) Mad-Croc BaBa Racing	BaBa	Mercury 2.5 V6	12	(Finland) Filip Roms	All	(South Africa) Wynand de Jager
Team Sweden	Molgaard	Mercury 2.5 V6	14	(Sweden) Jonas Andersson	All	
Team Sweden	Molgaard	Mercury 2.5 V6	15	(Sweden) Jesper Forss	All	
(United Arab Emirates) EMIC Racing Team	DAC	Mercury 2.5 V6	17	(Australia) Grant Trask	6–7	
(United Arab Emirates) EMIC Racing Team	BaBa	Mercury 2.5 V6	50	(Norway) Marit Strømøy	All	
(United Arab Emirates) EMIC Racing Team	DAC; Dragon	Mercury 2.5 V6	51	(Germany) Mike Szymura	All	
(United Arab Emirates) EMIC Racing Team	BaBa	Mercury 2.5 V6	80	(Italy) Ivan Brigada	2	
(Italy) Blaze Performance Team	DAC	Mercury 2.5 V6	23	(Poland) Bartek Marszalek	All	(Germany) Dietmar Kaiser
(Italy) Blaze Performance Team	Blaze	Mercury 2.5 V6	24	(Italy) Francesco Cantando	All	(Germany) Dietmar Kaiser
(United Arab Emirates) Emirates Racing Team	BaBa	Mercury 2.5 V6	27	(United Arab Emirates) Ahmed Al Hameli	2–7	(United States) Scott Gillman
(United Arab Emirates) Emirates Racing Team	DAC	Mercury 2.5 V6	28	(Sweden) Erik Stark	All	(United States) Scott Gillman
(United Arab Emirates) Emirates Racing Team	BaBa	Mercury 2.5 V6	29	(Italy) Ivan Brigada	1	(United States) Scott Gillman
(France) Maverick Racing	Moore	Mercury 2.5 V6	73	(France) Cédric Deguisne	2–3	

Key
Regular boat/driver
Boat ineligible for team points

=== Team and driver changes ===
There was a considerable amount of continuity from 2015 into the 2016 season as far as team and driver line-ups were concerned. Following the upheaval the previous year, the driver pairings at CTIC China, Victory Team, Team Abu Dhabi, Mad-Croc and Team Sweden were all unchanged. At the F1 Atlantic Team, Youssef Al Rubayan had retired, and was replaced by former Team EMIC driver Christophe Larigot to partner regular driver Duarte Benavente. To replace Larigot, Team EMIC hired promising rookie Mike Szymura. The German was already a three-time F4-S champion and would drive a Jonathan Jones-built Dragon boat from the second round onwards. Francesco Cantando's team retained himself and Bartek Marszalek as drivers, but lost their Motorglass sponsorship, thus reverting their name to Blaze Performance Team in deference to Cantando's self-built Blaze boats. Bernd Enzenhofer did not return for the team. At Emirates Racing, Ivan Brigada stood in for Ahmed Al Hameli at the opening round in Dubai, though Al Hameli returned for France, partnering Erik Stark for the rest of the year. Brigada meanwhile made a further appearance, this time for Team EMIC at Évian-les-Bains in a third boat. Cédric Deguisne's Maverick Racing team participated in the European rounds of the championship for a second year, while there were additional entries at the final two rounds. Grant Trask brought the Trask name back to Formula 1 powerboats when he drove a third boat for Team EMIC at both Abu Dhabi and Sharjah, while Rashed Al Qamzi, cousin to Thani Al Qamzi, was rewarded for winning the F4-S title with a one-off drive in Sharjah in a third boat for Team Abu Dhabi. Away from driver changes, another legend of the sport made a return to team activities as Renato Molinari joined the Emirates Team as Team Principal alongside Scott Gillman.

The popularity of the Moore hulls which were being campaigned so successfully by Philippe Chiappe was in evidence in 2016 as the manufacturer made a surprise switch from CTIC China to officially support Victory Team midway through the year. Victory had attempted to compete with their own hull, based closely on the Moore design, but with results not forthcoming, were able to convince the French boat builder to switch sides. The decision paid off, with Shaun Torrente taking Victory's first F1 win at the final race of the year in a Moore hull. Thus Chiappe's 2016 title win was the first since Jay Price's championship in 2009 where the team was not the primary supported outfit of the hull manufacturer - DAC in the case of Price who were officially supporting Guido Cappellini.

== Season calendar ==
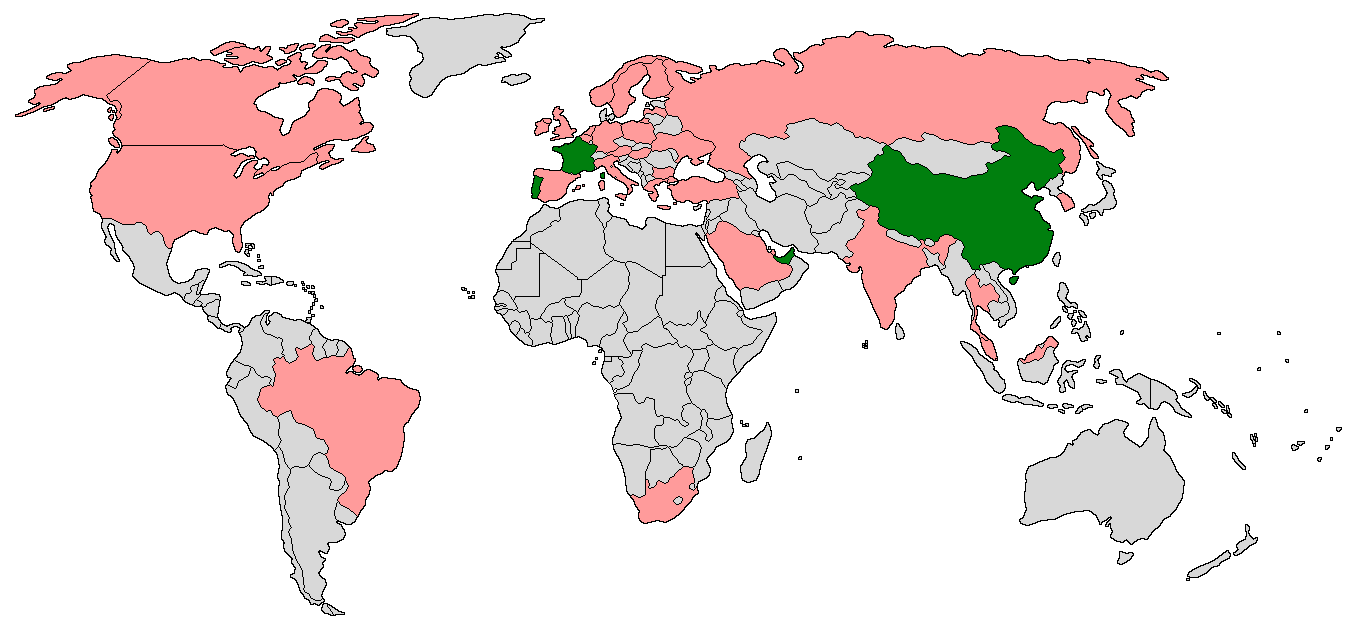
Countries that hosted F1 Powerboat races in 2016, shown in green. Former host nations are shown in pink.

A ten-race preliminary calendar for the 2016 championship was revealed in a press release on the sport's official website in January. Amongst regular fixtures Abu Dhabi and Sharjah were two new races, with the championship scheduled to make its first appearances in Dubai and Croatia. Races in France and Portugal returned after their re-introduction in 2015, although the Portuguese race switched venues from Porto back to its traditional location Portimão. China returned to having two races on the calendar, an arrangement last seen in 2010 when three races from the country featured. An additional two rounds, expected to be in Asia, were left vacant by the announcement to be confirmed at a later date. Speculation linked one of these vacant slots to a proposed race in Phuket, Thailand, which had provisionally held a slot on the 2015 calendar before the round was cancelled midway through the year. A race in Macau was also under negotiation to fill the other calendar slot. Ultimately however, neither the Thai nor Macau race materialised, while the Croatian event was also cancelled, leaving the calendar at seven confirmed races for the year.

Round	Race title	Date	Circuit location	Race winner	Hull/engine
1	(United Arab Emirates) 1st Grand Prix of Dubai	4 March	Dubai	(France) Philippe Chiappe	Moore/Mercury
2	20th Grand Prix of France	17 July	Évian-les-Bains	(Italy) Alex Carella	DAC/Mercury
3	15th Grand Prix of Portugal	31 July	Portimão	(France) Philippe Chiappe	Moore/Mercury
4	20th Grand Prix of China	4 September	Harbin	(Finland) Sami Seliö	BaBa/Mercury
5	21st Grand Prix of China	3 October	Liuzhou	(United Arab Emirates) Ahmed Al Hameli	BaBa/Mercury
6	(United Arab Emirates) 24th Grand Prix of Abu Dhabi	9 December	Abu Dhabi	(Sweden) Jonas Andersson	Molgaard/Mercury
7	(United Arab Emirates) 17th Grand Prix of Sharjah	16 December	Sharjah	(United States) Shaun Torrente	Moore/Mercury

== Results and standings ==
Points were awarded to the top 10 classified finishers. A maximum of two boats per team were eligible for points in the teams' championship.

Position	**1st**	**2nd**	**3rd**	**4th**	**5th**	**6th**	**7th**	**8th**	**9th**	**10th**
Points	20	15	12	9	7	5	4	3	2	1

=== Drivers standings ===
Pos	Driver	DUB (United Arab Emirates)	FRA (France)	POR (Portugal)	CHN (China)	CHN (China)	ABU (United Arab Emirates)	SHA (United Arab Emirates)	Points
1	(France) Philippe Chiappe	**1**	Ret	1	3	2	2	2	97
2	(United States) Shaun Torrente	3	3	3	4	4	4	1	83
3	(Finland) Sami Seliö	DNS	Ret	**2**	**1**	3	5	3	66
4	(Sweden) Jonas Andersson	4	Ret	4	2	7	**1**	**4**	66
5	(Italy) Alex Carella	2	**1**	5	Ret	Ret	3	Ret	54
6	(Finland) Filip Roms	9	2	13	Ret	10	7	7	26
7	(Sweden) Erik Stark	Ret	Ret	6	5	5	Ret	5	26
8	(United Arab Emirates) Ahmed Al Hameli		8	9	Ret	**1**	Ret	Ret	25
9	(Portugal) Duarte Benavente	6	7	8	7	8	8	8	25
10	(Norway) Marit Strømøy	Ret	6	11	6	Ret	6	9	17
11	(France) Cedric Deguisne		4	12					9
12	(China) Xiong Ziwei	5	Ret	14	9	11	Ret	Ret	9
13	(United Arab Emirates) Thani Al Qamzi	Ret	Ret	7	DSQ	6	Ret	Ret	9
14	(France) Christophe Larigot	12	5	15	11	12	10	Ret	8
15	(Poland) Bartek Marszalek	10	DNS	10	8	Ret	9	Ret	7
16	(Australia) Grant Trask						12	6	5
17	(Italy) Ivan Brigada	7	Ret						4
18	(Germany) Mike Szymura	13	10	Ret	10	9	13	Ret	4
19	(Italy) Francesco Cantando	8	Ret	17	Ret	Ret	11	Ret	3
20	(United Arab Emirates) Nadir Bin Hendi	11	9	16	DNS	14	14	10	3
21	(Sweden) Jesper Forss	Ret	DNS	18	Ret	13	Ret	Ret	0
	(United Arab Emirates) Rashed Al Qamzi							Ret	0

Key
Colour	Result
Gold	Winner
Silver	Second place
Bronze	Third place
Green	Other points position
Blue	Other classified position
Blue	Not classified, finished (NC)
Purple	Not classified, retired (Ret)
Red	Did not qualify (DNQ)
Red	Did not pre-qualify (DNPQ)
Black	Disqualified (DSQ)
White	Did not start (DNS)
White	Race cancelled (C)
Blank	Did not practice (DNP)
Blank	Excluded (EX)
Blank	Did not arrive (DNA)
Blank	Withdrawn (WD)
Blank	Did not enter (cell empty)
Text formatting	Meaning
**Bold**	Pole position
Italics	Fastest lap

=== Teams standings ===
Only boats with results eligible for points counting towards the teams' championship are shown here.

Pos	Team	Boat No.	DUB (United Arab Emirates)	FRA (France)	POR (Portugal)	CHN (China)	CHN (China)	ABU (United Arab Emirates)	SHA (United Arab Emirates)	Points
1	CTIC F1 Shenzhen China Team	1	**1**	Ret	1	3	2	2	2	106
1	CTIC F1 Shenzhen China Team	2	5	Ret	14	9	11	Ret	Ret	106
2	(Italy) Mad-Croc BaBa Racing	11	DNS	Ret	**2**	**1**	3	5	3	92
2	(Italy) Mad-Croc BaBa Racing	12	9	2	13	Ret	10	7	7	92
3	(United Arab Emirates) Victory Team	3	11	9	16	DNS	14	14	10	86
3	(United Arab Emirates) Victory Team	4	3	3	3	4	4	4	1	86
4	Team Sweden	14	4	Ret	4	2	7	**1**	**4**	66
4	Team Sweden	15	Ret	DNS	18	Ret	13	Ret	Ret	66
5	(United Arab Emirates) Team Abu Dhabi	5	Ret	Ret	7	DSQ	6	Ret	Ret	63
5	(United Arab Emirates) Team Abu Dhabi	6	2	**1**	5	Ret	Ret	3	Ret	63
6	(United Arab Emirates) Emirates Racing Team	27		8	9	Ret	**1**	Ret	Ret	55
6	(United Arab Emirates) Emirates Racing Team	28	Ret	Ret	6	5	5	Ret	5	55
6	(United Arab Emirates) Emirates Racing Team	29	7							55
7	(Portugal) F1 Atlantic Team	9	12	5	15	11	12	10	Ret	33
7	(Portugal) F1 Atlantic Team	10	6	7	8	7	8	8	8	33
8	(United Arab Emirates) EMIC Racing Team	50	Ret	6	11	6	Ret	6	9	21
8	(United Arab Emirates) EMIC Racing Team	51	13	10	Ret	10	9	13	Ret	21
9	(Italy) Blaze Performance Team	23	10	DNS	10	8	Ret	9	Ret	10
9	(Italy) Blaze Performance Team	24	8	Ret	17	Ret	Ret	11	Ret	10
10	(France) Maverick Racing	73		4	12					9

Key
Colour	Result
Gold	Winner
Silver	Second place
Bronze	Third place
Green	Other points position
Blue	Other classified position
Blue	Not classified, finished (NC)
Purple	Not classified, retired (Ret)
Red	Did not qualify (DNQ)
Red	Did not pre-qualify (DNPQ)
Black	Disqualified (DSQ)
White	Did not start (DNS)
White	Race cancelled (C)
Blank	Did not practice (DNP)
Blank	Excluded (EX)
Blank	Did not arrive (DNA)
Blank	Withdrawn (WD)
Blank	Did not enter (cell empty)
Text formatting	Meaning
**Bold**	Pole position
Italics	Fastest lap
