= Magnum Marine =

Luxury yacht manufacturer based in Miami, Florida

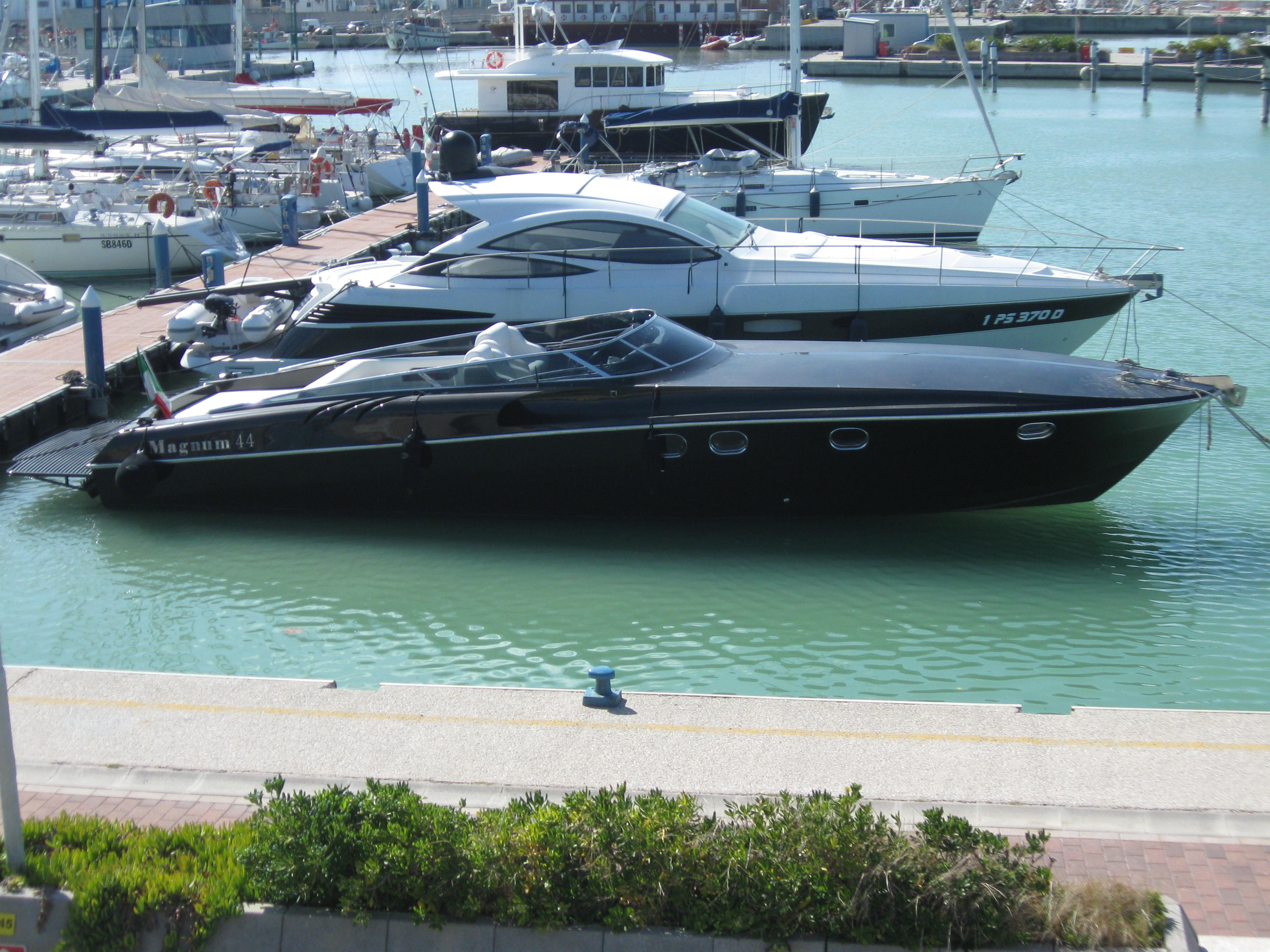
Magnum 44 powerboat moored at the Fano's Marina, Italy

The Magnum Marine Corporation is an American builder of performance and luxury yachts based in Miami, Florida.

== Design history ==
The beginning of the American high-performance, deep-vee boat-building industry is said to have started in 1958, with the first deep-vee hull, designed by Ray Hunt. The Hunt design had a 24-degree deadrise, which eliminated much of the pounding of the conventional hulls. An added feature of the Hunt design was longitudinal strakes on the bottom to give added lift and throw out the spray to keep the boat dry. This 24-degree deep-vee hull is the foundation of the Magnum design.

Naval architect, Jim Wynne, was impressed with the characteristics and performance of Hunt's boat and designed a similar deep-vee hull, which was equally successful. In 1962, Don Aronow, a retired real estate developer, asked Jim Wynne and Walt Walters to design a high performance Deep-Vee hull for him to race. This was the first of the famed, Aronow hulls, which he promoted first under the name Formula, then Donzi, then Magnum (1966 — 1968), then Cigarette boats.

== Company history ==
Magnum Marine in Miami, Florida, was founded in 1966, when Donald Aronow built two hulls specifically for the offshore powerboat racing circuit. These two designs, with which he launched Magnum Marine, were the Magnum 27’ and the Magnum 35’; both went on to become World Offshore Champions in Open Class racing. To these two models, he added a 16’ ski boat, the Marauder and a 16’ Catamaran, the Missile. Aronow sold Magnum Marine to Apeco in 1968. Apeco soon dropped the Missile and Marauder boats and launched the Magnum 25’, 28’ and 38’, which are now called the Magnum Classics.

In 1976 Magnum Marine was sold to Marchese Filippo Theodoli, an Italian boat builder, and his second wife Katrin. This brought a major change in the product line. Filippo Theodoli had the innovative idea of applying high-performance technology to larger, luxury yachts. And thus, the first high-performance yachts were born. These craft would reach the speeds of the race boats, but would have the comforts of the traditional yacht.

Filippo died in 1990 and is survived by his children; Lavinia Theodoli Spirito, Livia Theodoli-Wing, Francesco Theodoli and Giovanni Theodoli. His wife Katrin continues his legacy. With her new designs and continuously improved technology, Katrin has brought Magnum Marine's success to the Patrol Craft and Pleasure boat market. Giovanni Theodoli's (Katrin and Filippo's only son) addition to Magnum has been to seek to resurrect some of company's classics, such as the magnum 27’, which has been re-designed and re-released some 40 years after the original was first released.

=== Legal issues ===
In 1995, Magnum Marine was sued by William Farley and Alan Graves. The two were cruising on a sixty three foot Magnum Marine yacht off the coast of Portland, Maine when the boat caught fire and sank. The plaintiffs filed suit saying that the fire suppression system on the yacht was improperly "selected, designed, and installed". The plaintiff sought to recover the costs of both their personal possessions on board the yacht at the time of sinking, as well as for the yacht itself. The court eventually ruled in favor of Magnum Marine under the precedent of the East River Steamship.
