= Tom Gentry (offshore powerboat racer) =

American millionaire and offshore powerboat racer

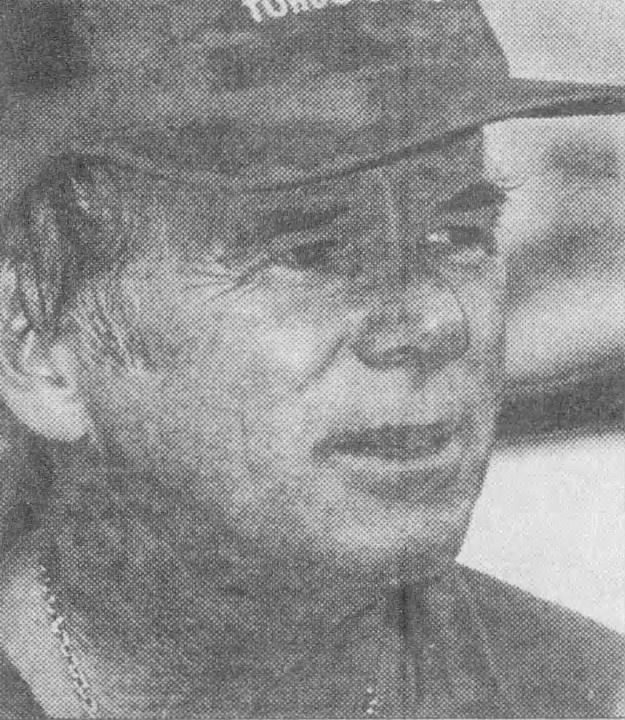
- Gentry in 1988

Personal information
- Born: August 30, 1930
- Died: January 15, 1998 (aged 67)

Sport
- Sport: Offshore powerboat racing

Tom Gentry (August 30, 1930 – January 15, 1998) was an American millionaire and offshore powerboat racer.

== Life and career ==
Gentry was raised in Orinda, California. He was a property developer.

Gentry competed at the 1976 World Offshore Power Boat Championship, winning first place.

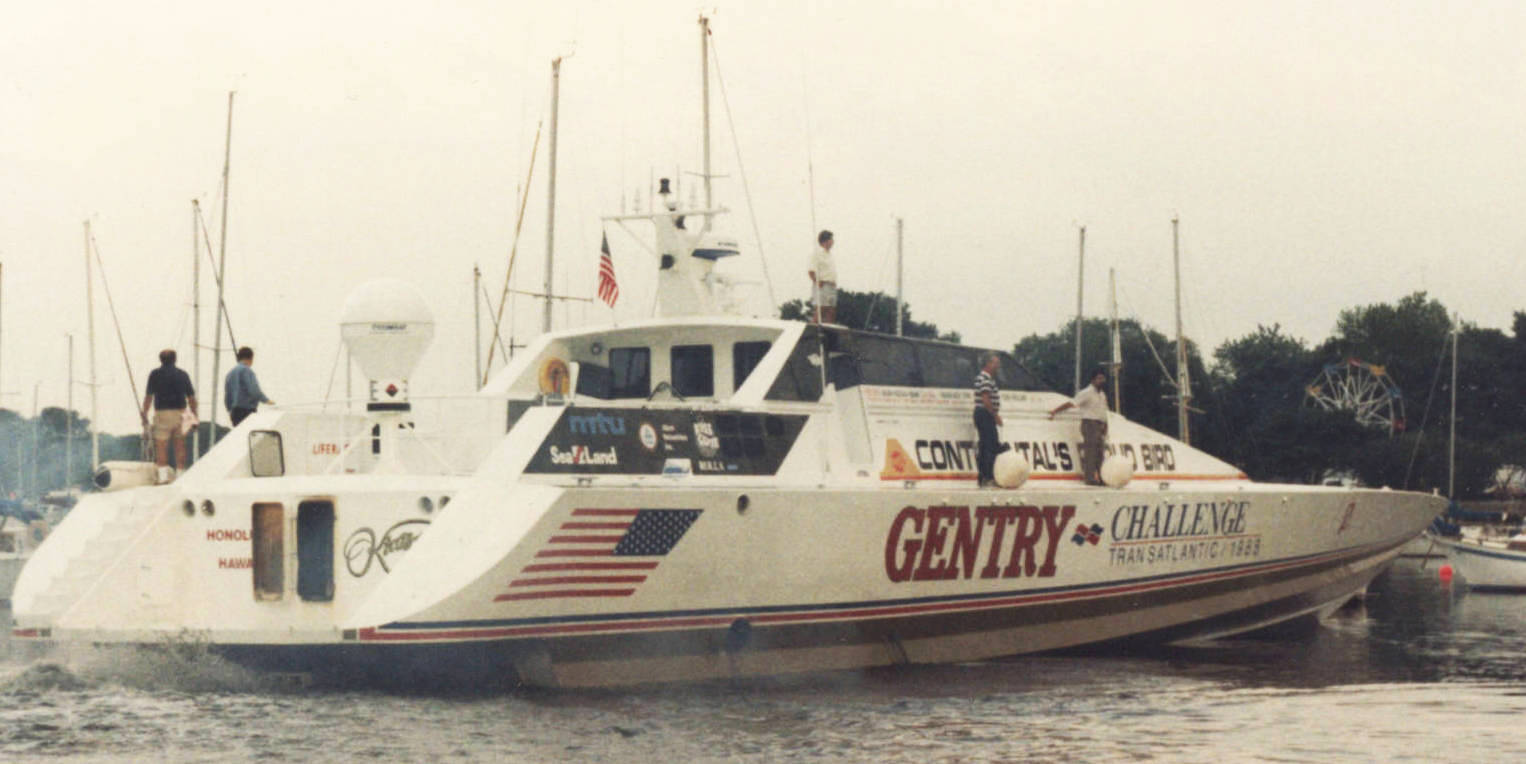
Tom Gentry's Gentry Eagle in Mamaroneck, New York

In 1989, Gentry set a speed record in transatlantic crossing with a time of 62 hours, 7 minutes and 47 seconds.

Gentry died on January 15, 1998, at the age of 67.
