= 2016 World Cup =

2016 World Cup may refer to:

- 2016 FIFA Futsal World Cup
- 2016 FIFA Club World Cup
- 2016 FIFA U-20 Women's World Cup
- 2016 FIFA U-17 Women's World Cup
- 2016 FINA Diving World Cup
- 2016 FINA Swimming World Cup
- 2016 Alpine Skiing World Cup
- 2016 Canoe Slalom World Cup
- 2016 ICC World Twenty20
- 2016 World Cup of Hockey
- 2016 World Cup of Golf

== See also ==
- 2016 World Championship (disambiguation)
