= 2014 F1 Powerboat World Championship =

2014 F1 Powerboat World Championship
Previous:	2013	Next:	2015

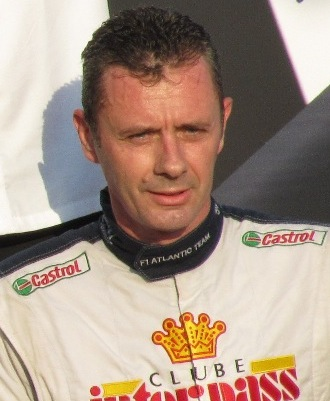
Philippe Chiappe (pictured in 2009) won his first championship.

The 2014 UIM F1 H_{2}O World Championship was the 31st season of Formula 1 Powerboat racing. Alex Carella, driving for the Qatar Team, entered the season as defending triple world champion having successfully defended his world championship for the second year in a row in 2013.

Carella's streak as champion was ended by France's Philippe Chiappe for the CTIC China Team. Chiappe won the final two races of the season in Abu Dhabi and Sharjah, overhauling a ten-point deficit to Carella and eventually won the championship – the first for a French competitor – by eight points. Carella had won the season's first two races in Doha and Liuzhou, before he was disqualified in the third race of the season, which was held in Doha. Third place in the championship went to Carella's teammate Shaun Torrente, who was the only other winner of the 2014 season, in the second Doha event. The results for Carella and Torrente were more than enough for the Qatar Team to win the teams' championship, 40 points clear of the CTIC China Team. The pole position and fastest lap trophies were also taken by Carella, beating Chiappe in both categories.

== Teams and drivers ==
Team	Hull	Engine	No.	Race drivers	Rounds
Qatar Team	DAC	Mercury 2.5 V6	1	(Italy) Alex Carella	All
Qatar Team	DAC	Mercury 2.5 V6	2	(United States) Shaun Torrente	All
(United Arab Emirates) Team Abu Dhabi	BaBa	Mercury 2.5 V6	5	(United Arab Emirates) Thani Al Qamzi	2, 4–5
(United Arab Emirates) Team Abu Dhabi	BaBa	Mercury 2.5 V6	6	(United Arab Emirates) Ahmed Al Hameli	2, 4–5
CTIC China Team	Moore	Mercury 2.5 V6	7	(France) Philippe Chiappe	All
CTIC China Team	DAC	Mercury 2.5 V6	8	(China) Xiong Ziwei	All
(Portugal) F1 Atlantic Team/Interpass/GC	DAC	Mercury 2.5 V6	9	(Kuwait) Youssef Al Rubayan	All
(Portugal) F1 Atlantic Team/Interpass/GC	BaBa	Mercury 2.5 V6	10	(Portugal) Duarte Benavente	All
(Italy) Mad Croc BaBa Racing Team	BaBa	Mercury 2.5 V6	11	(Finland) Sami Seliö	All
(Italy) Mad Croc BaBa Racing Team	BaBa	Mercury 2.5 V6	12	(Finland) Filip Roms	All
Team Sweden	Molgaard	Mercury 2.5 V6	14	(Sweden) Jonas Andersson	All
Team Sweden	Molgaard	Mercury 2.5 V6	15	(Sweden) Jesper Forss	2–5
(Italy) Motorglass F1 Team	BaBa	Mercury 2.5 V6	18	(Poland) Bartek Marszalek	1
(Italy) Motorglass F1 Team	BaBa	Mercury 2.5 V6	18	(Poland) Bartek Marszalek	2–6
(Italy) Motorglass F1 Team	DAC	Mercury 2.5 V6	23	(Italy) Marco Gambi	1
(Italy) Motorglass F1 Team	Blaze	Mercury 2.5 V6	24	(Italy) Francesco Cantando	All
(South Africa) Caudwell Racing	Caudwell	Caudwell 3.5 V6	33	(Italy) Ivan Brigada	2–4
(South Africa) Caudwell Racing	Caudwell	Caudwell 3.5 V6	34	(Slovakia) Tomas Cermak	2–4
(United States) Team Nautica	BaBa	Mercury 2.5 V6	50	(Norway) Marit Strømøy	All
(United States) Team Nautica	Molgaard	Mercury 2.5 V6	51	(Sweden) Erik Stark	All

Key
Regular boat/driver
Boat ineligible for team points

=== Team and driver changes ===
As in 2013, there were no major changes to the teams present in the 2014 championship. All nine were once again represented, albeit with some sporting new identities. The most significant of these was the new title sponsorship of Francesco Cantando's team. Known as Singha for many years, thanks to sponsorship from the Thai Singha brand of alcohol, Cantando signed a new deal ensuring his team would be known as the Motorglass F1 Team from 2014. Joining Cantando would once again be Bartek Marszalek who competed in five of the six races in 2013, and fellow Italian Marco Gambi. Whereas Bartek competed for the full year, Gambi was only present at the opening round in Doha. Jonas Andersson's team was the other to undergo a change of identity over the winter as he once again reverted to the Team Sweden name, having been sponsored by Azerbaijan the previous year. For the first race in Qatar, Andersson's team ran with just his own boat, but was joined by 2012 F-4S champion and fellow Swede Jesper Forss from the second race onwards.

At reigning champions the Qatar Team, everything remained the same with Alex Carella and Shaun Torrente again reprising their roles. Similarly, Team Abu Dhabi also retained Thani Al Qamzi and Ahmed Al Hameli for 2014, however they missed both races in Qatar, the first and third races of the season, reportedly due to matters relating to the politics in the region between Qatar and the UAE. CTIC China Team kept 2013 runner-up Philippe Chiappe and their young Chinese driver Xiong Ziwei whilst F1 Atlantic Team also stayed with their line-up of Youssef Al Rubayan and Duarte Benavente.

Sami Seliö and Filip Roms continued the all-Finnish line-up at the Mad Croc team for 2014 whilst Marit Strømøy led the campaign for Team Nautica again, and for 2014 was partnered with fellow Scandinavian, young Swedish driver Erik Stark, replacing the retired Rinaldo Osculati. Caudwell Racing were also back in the championship, campaigning their unique four-stroke engine package, but the team missed the first race in Qatar. An announcement during the summer however revealed their intentions for the rest of the season, with Ivan Brigada again leading the South African team alongside Slovak Tomáš Čermák who was returning to the sport for the first time since 2010. Despite a very popular double points finish for the team at the Grand Prix of the Middle East, with Brigada an excellent seventh, the challenges faced with running heavier four-stroke engines against the well-established and lighter Mercury two-strokes finally took its toll. Caudwell were forced to bow out of the championship prior to the fifth and final race of the season in Sharjah, with 2014 proving to be their most successful year.

== Season calendar ==
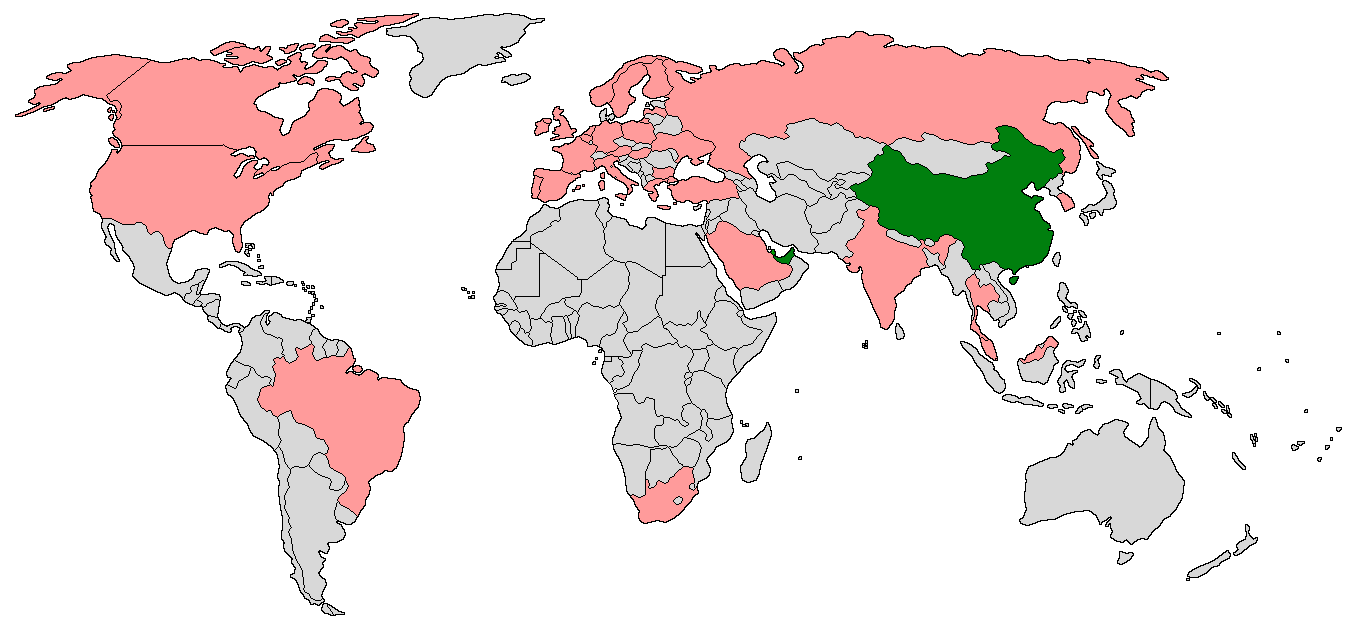
Countries that hosted F1 Powerboat races in 2014, shown in green. Former host nations are shown in pink.

A five race calendar made up the 2014 F1 Powerboat season, the smallest in the history of the championship. It began in Doha, Qatar on 15 March and ended in Sharjah, UAE on 19 December. Having pulled out in 2013, Russia did not return to the calendar for 2014, and in addition a Brazilian race was not held, despite its debut in 2013 amidst much fanfare. The round in Ukraine, scheduled for 24 August, was subsequently cancelled in the wake of the country's unrest, and an additional race in Qatar titled the Grand Prix of the Middle East was added to the calendar in Ukraine's place. A second round in China was expected initially, but was later removed from the schedule leaving Liuzhou as China's sole representation in 2014, marking 20 years since the championship first visited the country.

Round	Race title	Date	Circuit location	Race winner	Hull/Engine
1	11th Grand Prix of Qatar	15 March	Doha	(Italy) Alex Carella	DAC/Mercury
2	18th Grand Prix of China	6 October	Liuzhou	(Italy) Alex Carella	DAC/Mercury
3	(Qatar) 1st Grand Prix of the Middle East	15 November	Doha	(United States) Shaun Torrente	DAC/Mercury
4	(United Arab Emirates) 22nd Grand Prix of Abu Dhabi	21 November	Abu Dhabi	(France) Philippe Chiappe	Moore/Mercury
5	(United Arab Emirates) 15th Grand Prix of Sharjah	19 December	Sharjah	(France) Philippe Chiappe	Moore/Mercury

== Results and standings ==
Points were awarded to the top 10 classified finishers. A maximum of two boats per team were eligible for points in the teams' championship.

Position	**1st**	**2nd**	**3rd**	**4th**	**5th**	**6th**	**7th**	**8th**	**9th**	**10th**
Points	20	15	12	9	7	5	4	3	2	1

=== Drivers standings ===
Pos	Driver	QAT (Qatar)	CHN (China)	MID (Qatar)	ABU (United Arab Emirates)	SHA (United Arab Emirates)	Points
1	(France) Philippe Chiappe	2	Ret	2	**1**	**1**	70
2	(Italy) Alex Carella	1	**1**	DSQ	5	2	62
3	(United States) Shaun Torrente	Ret	4	**1**	2	3	56
4	(Finland) Sami Seliö	Ret	8	3	4	4	33
5	(Italy) Francesco Cantando	4	Ret	5	6	5	28
6	(Sweden) Erik Stark	Ret	2	6	8	Ret	23
7	(Portugal) Duarte Benavente	3	DNS	DNS	Ret	7	16
8	(Poland) Bartek Marszalek	8	5	8	10	9	16
9	(United Arab Emirates) Thani Al Qamzi		3		9	Ret	14
10	(United Arab Emirates) Ahmed Al Hameli		9		3	Ret	14
11	(Finland) Filip Roms	5	7	9	11	Ret	13
12	(Sweden) Jonas Andersson	**Ret**	Ret	4	Ret	Ret	9
13	(Norway) Marit Strømøy	6	Ret	11	7	DNS	9
14	(China) Xiong Ziwei	7	10	Ret	13	8	8
15	(Sweden) Jesper Forss		Ret	Ret	12	6	5
16	(Kuwait) Youssef Al Rubayan	Ret	6	Ret	Ret	Ret	5
17	(Italy) Ivan Brigada		Ret	7	Ret		4
18	(Slovakia) Tomas Cermak		Ret	10	Ret		1
	(Italy) Marco Gambi	DNS					

Key
Colour	Result
Gold	Winner
Silver	Second place
Bronze	Third place
Green	Other points position
Blue	Other classified position
Blue	Not classified, finished (NC)
Purple	Not classified, retired (Ret)
Red	Did not qualify (DNQ)
Red	Did not pre-qualify (DNPQ)
Black	Disqualified (DSQ)
White	Did not start (DNS)
White	Race cancelled (C)
Blank	Did not practice (DNP)
Blank	Excluded (EX)
Blank	Did not arrive (DNA)
Blank	Withdrawn (WD)
Blank	Did not enter (cell empty)
Text formatting	Meaning
**Bold**	Pole position
Italics	Fastest lap

=== Teams standings ===
Only boats with results eligible for points counting towards the teams' championship are shown here.

Pos	Team	Boat No.	QAT (Qatar)	CHN (China)	MID (Qatar)	ABU (United Arab Emirates)	SHA (United Arab Emirates)	Points
1	Qatar Team	1	1	**1**	DSQ	5	2	118
1	Qatar Team	2	Ret	4	**1**	2	3	118
2	CTIC China Team	7	2	Ret	2	**1**	**1**	78
2	CTIC China Team	8	7	10	Ret	13	8	78
3	(Italy) Mad Croc BaBa Racing Team	11	Ret	8	3	4	4	46
3	(Italy) Mad Croc BaBa Racing Team	12	5	7	9	11	Ret	46
4	(Italy) Motorglass F1 Team	18		5	8	10	9	41
4	(Italy) Motorglass F1 Team	23	DNS					41
4	(Italy) Motorglass F1 Team	24	4	Ret	5	6	5	41
5	(United States) Team Nautica	50	6	Ret	11	7	DNS	32
5	(United States) Team Nautica	51	Ret	2	6	8	Ret	32
6	(United Arab Emirates) Team Abu Dhabi	5		3		9	Ret	28
6	(United Arab Emirates) Team Abu Dhabi	6		9		3	Ret	28
7	(Portugal) F1 Atlantic Team/Interpass/GC	9	Ret	6	Ret	Ret	Ret	21
7	(Portugal) F1 Atlantic Team/Interpass/GC	10	3	DNS	DNS	Ret	7	21
8	Team Sweden	14	**Ret**	Ret	4	Ret	Ret	14
8	Team Sweden	15		Ret	Ret	12	6	14
9	(South Africa) Caudwell Racing	33		Ret	7	Ret		5
9	(South Africa) Caudwell Racing	34		Ret	10	Ret		5

Key
Colour	Result
Gold	Winner
Silver	Second place
Bronze	Third place
Green	Other points position
Blue	Other classified position
Blue	Not classified, finished (NC)
Purple	Not classified, retired (Ret)
Red	Did not qualify (DNQ)
Red	Did not pre-qualify (DNPQ)
Black	Disqualified (DSQ)
White	Did not start (DNS)
White	Race cancelled (C)
Blank	Did not practice (DNP)
Blank	Excluded (EX)
Blank	Did not arrive (DNA)
Blank	Withdrawn (WD)
Blank	Did not enter (cell empty)
Text formatting	Meaning
**Bold**	Pole position
Italics	Fastest lap
