= Betty Cook =

Betty Cook (1923-1990) was an Honors Graduate from MIT and a world champion offshore powerboat racer and was inducted in to the Motorsports Hall of Fame of America in 1996.

Cook grew up as Betty Young in Glens Falls, New York, earned a degree in political science from Boston University and then attended Massachusetts Institute of Technology, where she met her future husband, Paul Cook. They moved to California, where they became involved in powerboat racing.

Cook won 17 races, two world championships (1977 and 1979), and was a three-time American Power Boat Association US champion (1978, 1979, 1981). She was the first woman to win the powerboat world championship (1977) in what had been traditionally a male-only sport.
