= Jerry Jacoby =

Boat race driver

Jerry Jacoby is a boat race driver. He is former UIM Offshore PowerBoat World Champion (1981) and APBA American Champion (1982).

== Career ==
His first race was in the 1978 Tampa Bay Race. He rented one of Joel Halpern's 38' Cobra's (named 'Beep Beep'). Jacoby finished 3rd, despite suffering from an extremely slow start that placed him five minutes behind the leaders after the first lap.

Jacoby then purchased the 35' Cigarette Anheuser Busch from Rocky Aoki, (this 35' Cigarette had formerly powered Tom Gentry to a World Championship in 1976). Named the 'Ajac Hawk', after his Elmont, New York-based transmission parts business, Jacoby finished 3rd in the next race, the Bacardi Trophy Race.

In 1979 Jacoby started a high performance marine engine company, Hawk Marine Power, which became the supplier to several of the world's premier offshore racers. In 1981, HMP's engines were in 4 of the 5 class of boats entered in the World Championship. All four with Hawk's engines won their World Championship class. In 1979 Jacoby had close friend Don Aronow build him a 37.6-foot Cigarette racer, also named Ajac Hawk. It was the first of the 'Top Gun' line of Cigarette power boats. It was made by putting a 'block' into the 39' Cigarette mold, and fixing the raised bar deck of the 36' wide-beam racer (but with the standard 8' beam of the 35' and 39' models).

In 1981 Jacoby won the World Championship in Key West with his 37.6' Cigarette, Ajac Hawk. Ajac Hawk was later renamed Cigarette Hawk. In 1982 Jacoby won the Bacardi Trophy Race and finished the 1982 season, leading in points and became the USA National Champion. In 1981 he purchased the Cigarette Boat company from Don Aronow. In 1983, Faberge became Jacoby's sponsor, and the Cigarette Hawk was renamed Super Brut.
