= Sterndrive =

Type of boat engine

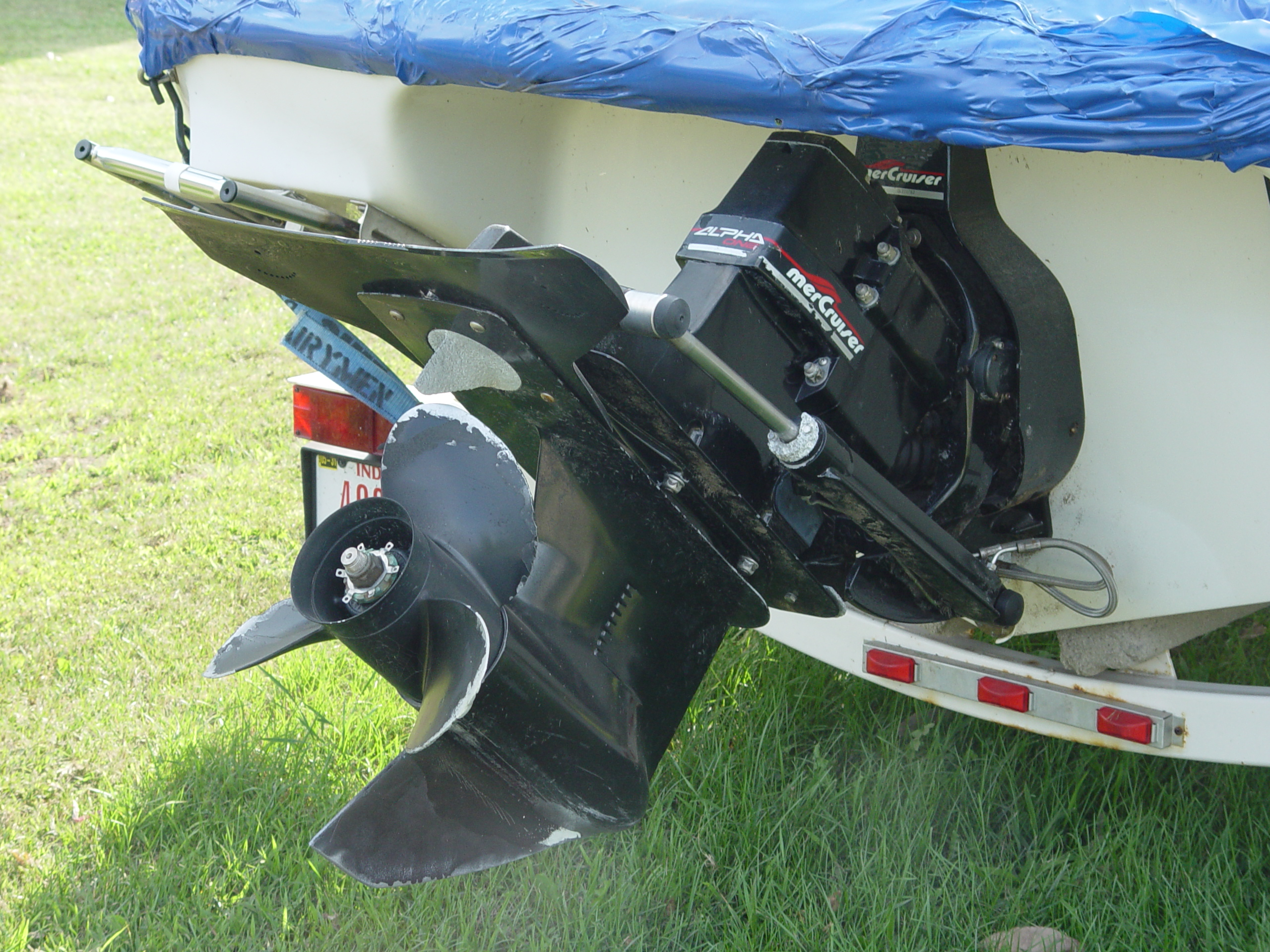
The outdrive unit of a boat with sterndrive

A sterndrive or inboard/outboard drive (I/O) is a form of marine propulsion which combines inboard power with outboard drive. The engine sits just forward of the transom while the drive unit (outdrive or drive leg) lies outside the hull.

== Operation ==
The drive unit (outdrive) carries power from the inboard engine, typically mounted above the waterline, outboard through the transom and downward to the propeller below the waterline.

The outdrive resembles the bottom half of an outboard motor and is composed of two sub-units: an upper containing a driveshaft connected through the transom to an engine which transmits power to a 90-degree-angle gearbox; and the lower containing a vertical driveshaft receiving power from the upper unit gearbox, transmitted through another 90-degree-angle gearbox to the propeller shaft.

The boat is steered by pivoting the outdrive, as on an outboard motor; no rudder is needed. The outdrive is pivoted up for trailer travel and between uses to avoid fouling.

The outdrive can be matched with a variety of engines in the appropriate power range; upper and lower units can often be purchased separately to customize gear ratios and propeller RPM, and lower units are also available with counter-rotating gearing to provide balanced torque in dual-drive installations.

Sterndrive engines are similar to those used in true inboard systems. Historically the most popular in North America were "marinised" versions of Chevrolet and Ford V-8 automotive engines. In Europe diesel engines are more popular, ranging up to 400 hp in models such as the Volvo Penta D6A-400.

Other brands of sterndrive include MerCruiser (produced by Brunswick Corporation's Mercury Marine, which also manufactures outboard motors). Mercruiser have a slightly larger market share in the US, while in Europe Volvo Penta has an approximate 80% market share.

== History ==
The history of stern drive power begins in the First World War with the production of the MAS of Isotta Fraschini, with two counter-rotating propellers.

In 1948, Mercury Marine engineer Charlie Strang mated an aluminum car racing engine to the lower unit of an outboard motor, creating a marine propulsion system more powerful than the outboard motors available at the time. During the 1950s, he and fellow engineer Jim Wynne worked at Mercury under founder Carl Kiekhaefer, who was initially dismissive of and opposed to a technology that would later capture 80% of the market. In 1959 Wynne left Kiekhaefer and in less than 90 days developed his own stern drive, which he subsequently patented.

The first commercial introduction of sterndrives was the Volvo Penta "Aquamatic" at the 1959 New York Motor Boat Show. Kiekhaefer introduced a MerCruiser outdrive in 1961 at the Chicago Boat Show. By 1962, 16 manufacturers were producing sterndrives. There was also the Outboard Marine Corporation (O.M.C.); however, due to several patent wars, O.M.C. ceased production.

== Characteristics ==
Advantages of the sterndrive system versus outboards include higher available horsepower per engine and a clean transom with no cutouts for the outboard installation and no protruding powerhead, which makes for easier ingress and egress for pleasure boat passengers, easier fishing and easier retrieval in rescue situations.

Advantages of the sterndrive system versus inboards include simpler engineering for boatbuilders, eliminating the need for them to design propshaft and rudder systems; ease of trailering and shallow water maneuvering (with the drive trimmed up); also, a significant space savings with the engine mounted all the way aft, freeing up the boat's interior volume for occupancy space. This is of particular significance to consumers who are interested in "pocket cruisers," boats which have amenities like a head, a galley, and separate sleeping quarters in a boat less than 30 feet in length.

The main disadvantages of sterndrives versus straight inboards is that they are more exposed. There are hoses, rubber bellows and oil lines in the water which can be damaged. There are also more components in the water which are exposed to corrosion.

Maintenance on I/Os is more complicated than outboards in several ways, less in others. While sterndrive engines are not as readily removable as smaller outboards, larger outboards (which combine both large powerheads and outdrives) are bigger, bulkier, and heavier than separate engine and outdrive components on sterndrives. Sterndrive engine compartments may be cramped; however components are neither as tightly engineered nor physically as compressed and densely packed as outboards, which all must fit under a streamlined integrated cover.

With both inboards and stern drives there is a fire and explosion hazard from gasoline fuel vapors within the engine compartment. Typically these boats must run a blower for several minutes prior to starting the engine, and when idling or moving below cruise speed. The blower exchanges the air within the engine compartment with fresh outside air.

Because of their practical advantages and attractive cost, sterndrives have become extremely popular especially for use in pleasure boats, and there are many models of boats for which sterndrive power is the only available propulsion offered.

== See also ==
- Kitchen rudder
