= Jim Wynne =

James "Jim" Wynne (1929–1990) was an American businessperson.

== Biography ==
Wynne was born in Dayton, Ohio. He studied at the University of Florida and the Massachusetts Institute of Technology. He started his career at Kiekhaefer Corporation. His work involved Mercury outboard motor testing and participation in a notable 1958 transatlantic voyage with an outboard-powered boat.

During his career, Wynne builit the first turbine-powered Thunderbird, a production boat for Donald Aronow, and the commercial sterndrive propulsion system (1968).

Using his engineering skills in powerboat racing, Wynne won the World Offshore Championship twice and set numerous powerboat records. He later established Wynne Marine, Inc. (1965), a firm known for designing marine vessels.

Wynne died in 1990.
