= Seatek SPa diesels =

Diesel engine manufacturer

Seatek SPa
- Company type: Private
- Industry: diesel engines for marine propulsion
- Founded: 1986
- Headquarters: Lombardy, Italy
- Key people: Carlo Bonomi
- Website: www.seatek-spa.com

Seatek Spa is an Italian company that designs and manufactures marine diesel engines and propulsion systems. The company is based in Annone Brianza, Italy. It was founded in 1986 and produces engines primarily intended for high-performance and professional maritime applications, including patrol vessels, high-speed craft, and offshore powerboats.

== History ==
Carlo Bonomi founded Seatek in 1986 after a career in offshore racing.

During the 1990s, Seatek engines were used in competitive offshore racing and contributed to several racing successes. Technologies developed for racing applications were later applied to professional and defense craft. In the 2000s and 2010s, Seatek expanded its presence among shipyards supplying patrol, interceptor, and fast response vessels to government agencies and maritime authorities in Europe and other regions.

Seatek supplies engines to shipyards, government organizations, and commercial operators in Europe, the Middle East, and Asia. Clients include coast guard and maritime enforcement bodies, commercial fast-vessel operators, and offshore racing teams.

== Products ==
Seatek produces six- and twelve-cylinder marine diesel engines. The engines are characterized by high power-to-weight ratios and are designed for marine operating environments. Many components are manufactured from corrosion-resistant materials to suit prolonged exposure to saltwater.

=== Applications ===
- Patrol and coastal security vessels
- Interceptor and special operations craft
- Rescue and response boats
- Offshore powerboat racing
- Commercial and leisure high-speed craft
- Engineering and Production

The company conducts design, machining, assembly, and testing at its facilities in Italy. Each engine undergoes full-load testing before delivery. Seatek also maintains technical support programs and training for client maintenance teams.

In 2025, the company partnered with diagnostic-equipment manufacturer Texa S.p.A. to integrate advanced diagnostic software across its marine engine line.

== Research and development ==
Research activities focus on combustion efficiency, hybrid propulsion integration, lightweight component development, and digital engine monitoring. Seatek has been involved in projects related to reduced acoustic signatures and low-emission systems for naval and civilian use.

== See also ==
- Marine diesel engine
- Offshore powerboat racing
- Interceptor aircraft
