= Richard Bertram =

American sailor and boat builder

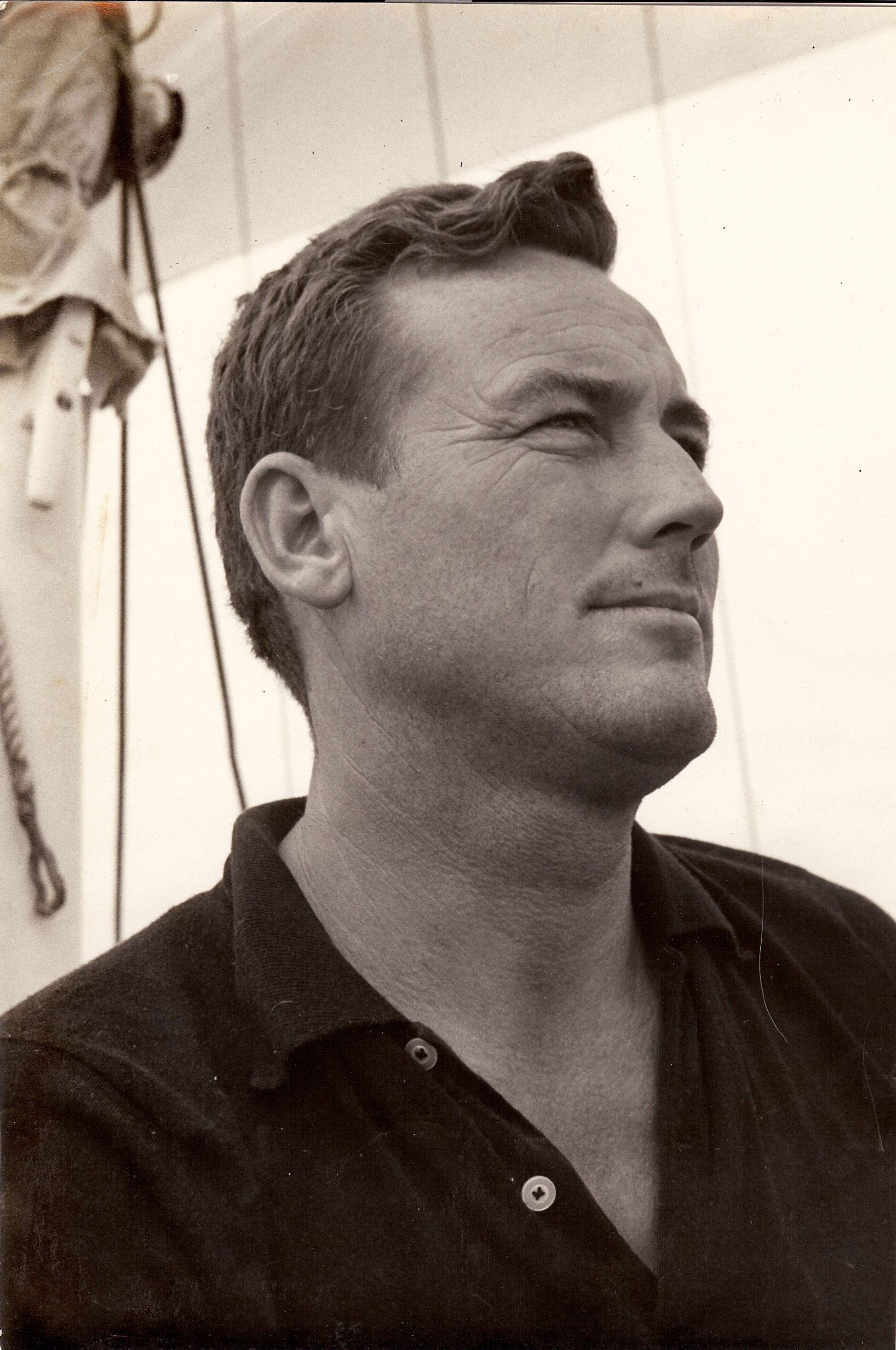
- Richard Bertram at helm of sailboat, FINISTERRE, during Bermuda Race
- Born: 4 February 1916; East Orange, New Jersey
- Died: 28 April 2000 (aged 84); Stuart, Florida
- Occupations: Sailor, boat builder and yacht broker
- Spouses: Katherine Ivins Bertram (m. 1946–1951) Pauline Meagher Bertram (m. 1952–1967) Lenore Lonergan (m. 1972–1987) Francesca Morales Bertram (m. 1994)
- Children: Charlotte Bertram; Gretchen Bertram Whalen; Kim Bertram; Scott Bertram; Anne Bertram Endler; Caroline Bertram; Morgan Bertram; Colin Bertram; Digby Bertram; Madelaine Bertram Osborne
- Relatives: Katharine Whalen(granddaughter); John Holzman (stepson)

Richard Howard Bertram (4 February 1916 – 28 April 2000) was a champion sailor on powerboats and racing yachts and a leading boat builder and broker. Born in East Orange, New Jersey, Bertram learned to sail at a young age with his parents on the waters of Barnegat Bay. He owned his first boat at age 8, sailed in his first race at age 10 and was skipper of intercollegiate championship boats while attending Cornell University. After college, Bertram continued competing in numerous races throughout the world and was notably referred to by Sports Illustrated as "one of the finest ocean racers anywhere". In 1947, Bertram relocated to Miami, FL, where he opened Richard Bertram & Company, a successful yacht brokerage firm. Among his clients were Aristotle Onassis, the Aga Khan, King Hussein of Jordan and Prince Bertil of Sweden. With his yacht brokerage business successful, Bertram continued racing and set standards in the World Offshore Powerboat circuit. Often, he raced in his own 31' Bertram Lucky Moppie. He founded Bertram Yacht, a Miami-based manufacturer of production pleasure boats, in 1960. Bertram Yacht began the first large production runs of boats with C. Raymond Hunt's revolutionary deep-V hull design. In 1963 Richard Bertram licensed International Marine of Scoresby, Victoria, Australia to manufacture Bertram yachts; however, he left Bertram Yacht in 1964 to focus on his brokerage business, and Bertram Yacht changed ownership several times in the decades after that.

== Races ==
- Lightning World 1948, Champion
- Lightning World 1949, Champion
- Southern Ocean Racing Conference 1949, Champion Tiny Teal
- Southern Ocean Racing Conference 1950, Champion Ticonderoga
- Southern Ocean Racing Conference 1951, Champion Belle of the West
- Havana-San Sebastian Transatlantic Race 1951, Champion Malabar XIII
- Cat Cay Race 1955, Champion Finisterre
- Newport - Bermuda Race (Bermuda Race) 1956, Champion Finisterre
- Miami-Nassau Race 1956, Champion Doodles II
- Miami-Nassau Race 1957, Champion Doodles III
- Newport - Bermuda Race (Bermuda Race) 1958, Champion Finisterre
- America’s Cup 1958 Vim
- Newport - Bermuda Race (Bermuda Race) 1960, Champion Finisterre
- Miami-Nassau Race 1960 Champion Lucky Moppie
- Miami-Nassau Race 1961, Champion Lucky Moppie
- Miami-Nassau Race 1962, Champion Lucky Moppie
- Miami-Nassau Race 1963, Champion Lucky Moppie
- Miami-Nassau Race 1964, Second Place Lucky Moppie
- Cowes Torquay Race 1965
- Transatlantic Race Malabar VII
- Transatlantic Race Ondinne

== Awards ==
- World Champion of Offshore Boat Racing 1965
- NMMA (National Marine Manufacturers Association) 2007 Hall of Fame Inductee
- Barnegat Bay Sailing Hall of Fame 2008 Inductee
