= Victory Team =

Offshore powerboat racing team

Victory Team is a government-owned offshore powerboat racing team and builder from the United Arab Emirates. It is one of Ahmed bin Saeed Al Maktoum's several business interests and is considered to be one of the most successful teams in the sport. It currently competes in the Formula 1 Powerboat World Championship, Aquabike World Championship (powerboating), Class 1 World Powerboat Championship, doing so since its inaugural season in 1992.

== History ==
The team made its offshore powerboat racing debut in 1986, but it wasn't until 1990 that it began to build its own boat. During the final two rounds of the inaugural season of the Class 1 Championship in 1992, Victory Team debuted as a guest entry, and finished first and second in both of its races. It went on to win the title at the following season.

The team has since won 14 C1 World Championships (1993, 1995, 1996, 1999, 2000, 2001, and from 2007 to 2014), 8 European Championships (1999, 2000, 2001, 2004, 2007, 2009, 2010 and 2014), 7 Middle East Championships (2002, 2005 and from 2008 to 2012), 5 Pole Position Titles and 4 C2 World Championships (1996, 1998, 2000, 2001), making them one of the most successful teams in offshore powerboat racing.

During the period from 1999 to 2012, the team was run by Gianfranco Venturelli, a former Lamborghini, Ferrari and Chrysler executive. Under his tenure, the team moved to purpose-built 15,000 sq.m facilities enabling a ramp-up in manufacturing, engineering, operational and logistics capabilities to support both racing and commercial activities. Engineering projects were wholly managed in-house, with support from external suppliers primarily from the automotive industry. The team notably carried out its own power and drive train development, using its state-of-the-art testing facilities, and was the only team with the in-house capability and infrastructure to conduct cutting edge R&D.

The team builds its own boats in-house, utilizing designs by Michael Peters, the majority of teams, including Bjørn Rune Gjelsten's Spirit of Norway, use boats built by Victory.

The team scored its eighth world title in 2008.

== Commercial Division ==
In 2002, the team branched out to build boat custom made commercially for use in not just powerboat racing and for pleasure, but boats for commercial maritime vessels, notably patrol boats

There are currently four boats in its range:

- 56 Fast Yacht
- VT-P56 Patrol
- VT-P46 Patrol
- VT-56 Fast Fishing

== Incidents ==
In 1995, one of its drivers, the 1994 Class One champion, Hamed Buhaleeba, was killed whilst leading the race when his boat somersaulted and landed upside down during a Class 2 race at Cowes, in the Isle of Wight. His boat hit a wave and flew out of the water, only for it to land upside down while he was trapped in the boat. When his boat was reached by emergency crew, he was taken to a hospital in Gosport and was pronounced dead later. Hamed was acting as a throttle man for his brother Rashid, who was uninjured. A trophy was named in his honour, which is awarded to the highest placed oversea competitor at the Cowes-Torquay race.

In 1993, during the Class 1 World Championship, held at Ischia, in the Tyrrhenian Sea, one of its boats, driven by Saeed Al Tayer and Felix Serralles, in an attempt to overtake their teammates Khalfan Harib and Ed Colyer, went wide and crashed into jury's boat that had drifted onto the course, sinking it instantly, instantly killing the boat owner Francesco Rando and an 18-year-old boy who was on the boat, where he died from injuries after being taken to hospital. Four other people and the drivers escaped with minor injuries.

11 December 2009: Dubai (UAE): Pilots Mohammad Al Mehairi from the UAE, and Jean-Marc Sanchez of France, were killed following a racing accident during race one of the Dubai Grand Prix, the final round of the Class 1 World Powerboat Championship. The two pilots, representing the Dubai Victory Team, were involved in a high-speed crash during the early stages of the race at the Dubai International Marine Club, which was subsequently red-flagged. Safety personnel attended to both pilots at the scene. They were subsequently airlifted to a local hospital, where all efforts to resuscitate them were in vain. As a mark of respect to both pilots and their families, the event organisers cancelled the final day's race.
