= Donald Aronow =

American speedboat designer (1927–1987)

- Born: March 3, 1927; Brooklyn, New York, U.S.
- Died: February 3, 1987 (aged 59); Miami, Florida, U.S.
- Cause of death: Murder
- Education: Brooklyn College
- Occupations: Boat designer; builder; racer
- Years active: 1953–1987
- Spouses: Shirley Goldin (m. 1948; div. 1979): Lillian Crawford
- Children: 5

Donald Joel Aronow (March 3, 1927 – February 3, 1987) was an American designer, builder, and racer of Formula, Donzi, Magnum Marine, Cary, and Cigarette Racing Team speedboats. Aronow built speedboats for the Shah of Iran, Charles Keating, Robert Vesco, Malcolm Forbes, George H. W. Bush, and Lyndon B. Johnson.

== Early life and education ==
Aronow was born in the Sheepshead Bay neighborhood of Brooklyn, the son of Russian–Jewish immigrants Herman and Ruth Aronow. He had two older sisters, Sylvia and Lillian. Aronow graduated as a top athlete from James Madison High School in 1944, worked as a lifeguard at Coney Island, and enrolled at Brooklyn College. In 1945, he joined the United States Merchant Marine and worked overseas until the end of World War II. In 1947, he returned to the United States and completed his studies. He graduated from Brooklyn College in 1948 with a physical education degree, earning letters in football, wrestling, and track.

== Career ==
After finishing school, Aronow was briefly a physical education teacher before working for his father-in-law's construction business. In 1953, he established a construction company, the Aronow Corporation. Following the success of his construction company, Aronow moved to Miami in 1959, where he began racing boats as a hobby.

Aronow's hobby evolved into a business, and by the end of 1962, he had formed the Formula Marine boat company. He sold Formula Marine to Alliance Machine in Ohio. In 1964, he started Donzi Marine, which he sold to Teleflex Inc. in mid-1965. In 1966, he founded Magnum Marine and in 1967 won his first world championship.

Due to a non-compete clause following the sale of Magnum Marine, Aronow was not permitted to build boats for several years. Despite this, in 1969 Aronow built the first Cigarette boat under the name Cary, in Elton Cary's Miami Beach facility. In 1969, Aronow won his second World Championship and third consecutive United States Championship. He was the second American to win the Union Internationale Motonautique's Gold Medal of Honor. In 1970, after the non-compete clause expired, Aronow started the Cigarette Racing Team.

Having sold Cigarette in 1982, Aronow formed USA Racing Team and built the Blue Thunders, 39-foot catamarans used by the United States Customs Service to patrol U.S. waters for illegal offshore activities, especially drug smuggling. Aronow's close friend at the time, Vice President George H.W. Bush, was a former Cigarette owner and was involved in testing out the 39-foot catamarans prior to government approval.

== Murder ==
On February 3, 1987, Aronow was murdered in his car at the end of 188th Street in North Miami Beach, where his boat companies operated. Aronow had just come out of a meeting. Witnesses said a blue Lincoln pulled up next to Aronow's car. When Aronow rolled down his window, the Lincoln's driver shot him.

In 1995, Bobby Young admitted to the shooting and pleaded no contest to second degree murder, eventually providing a full confession in 2009 shortly before his death. Ben Kramer, winner of the 1986 American Power Boat Association Offshore Championship, pleaded no contest to manslaughter in 1996. Kramer had a business dispute with Aronow after buying Aronow's USA Racing Team, but was forced to sell it back after the Customs Service refused to do business with him. Kramer was already in prison on a life sentence with no possibility of parole following 1988 and 1989 convictions for drug smuggling and gun charges, as well as receiving a 1990 conviction for a failed escape attempt by helicopter from a federal prison near Miami.

The story was also the basis for the 2009 documentary film Thunder Man: The Don Aronow Story and the 2018 movie Speed Kills with John Travolta.

== Personal life ==
In 1948, Aronow married Shirley Goldin, whom he had met while working as a lifeguard on Coney Island. They had three children: Michael, David, and Claudia. Aronow and Goldin were divorced in 1979. Aronow's second wife was Lillian Crawford. He and Crawford had two sons, Gavin and Wylie.
