= Offshore powerboat racing =

Type of racing by ocean-going powerboats

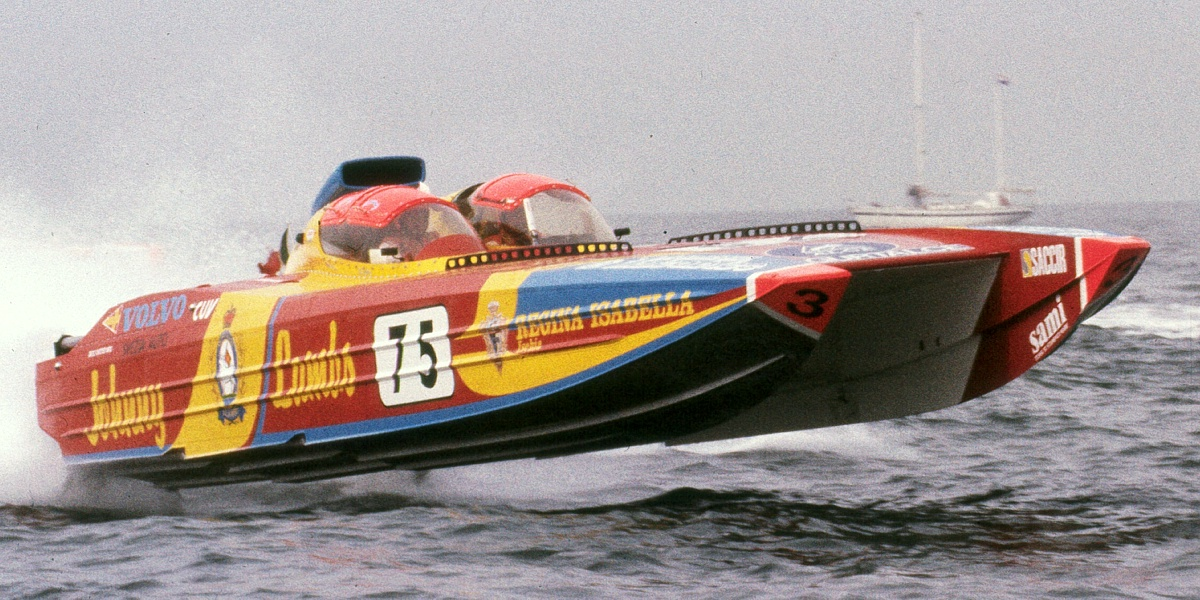
Class 1 offshore powerboat

Offshore powerboat racing is a type of racing by ocean-going powerboats, typically point-to-point or circuit racing conducted in open water conditions.

Globally, offshore powerboat racing is led by the Union Internationale Motonautique (UIM), which sanctions multiple championship series including Class 1, XCAT World Championship, and various regional competitions. In the United States, the sport operates under multiple sanctioning bodies including the American Power Boat Association (APBA), the International Hot Rod Association (IHRA), and the Offshore Powerboat Association (OPA). In the United Kingdom, the sport is governed by the British Powerboat Racing Club (BPRC) for traditional events and the United Kingdom Offshore Powerboat Racing Association (UKOPRA) for the national championship.

The sport is financed through a mixture of private funding, commercial sponsorship, and increasingly substantial prize purses, with the IHRA announcing a $2 million purse for its 2026 offshore series.

== History ==
=== Early Development (1903–1960s) ===
In 1903, the Automobile Club of Great Britain and Ireland and its offshoot, the Marine Motor Association, organised a race of auto-boats, with the winner awarded the Harmsworth Trophy. Offshore powerboat racing was first recognised as a sport when a race took place in 1904 from the south-eastern coast of England to Calais, France. In the United States, the American Power Boat Association (APBA) was formed soon thereafter, with the first recorded U.S. race in 1911 in California.

The sport increased in popularity over the next few years in the United States, with 10 races scheduled during the 1917 season. The sport's growth was disrupted in Europe during World War I.

Between 1927 and 1935, there was considerable interest in power boat racing in Europe both on seawater and on freshwater rivers and lakes. These boats, described as hydroplanes, were powered by Evinrude, Elto, Johnson, Lockwood, and Watermota outboard engines.

=== Modern Era (1960s–1980s) ===
The sport entered the modern era in the 1960s, with notable names like Jim Wynne, Don Aronow, and Dick Bertram competing in events such as the Bahamas 500-mile (800 km) race. During that time, the navigator position in the raceboat was extremely important, as finding small checkpoints over hundred-mile open ocean runs was a difficult endeavour.

Jim Wynne, an engineer who invented the stern drive propulsion system, won the World Offshore Championship in 1964 and 1966 in boats of his own design. Don Aronow founded Formula Marine in 1962, collaborating with Wynne and Walt Walters to develop high-performance deep-vee hulls, and went on to establish iconic brands including Donzi Marine, Magnum Marine, and Cigarette Racing.

The list of modern world champions extended into the 1980s, when the sport entered the catamaran and then the 'superboat' era. The 1000 cubic inch total engine displacement restrictions were lifted for boats over 45 feet (14 m) in length, and soon three- and four-engine boats sporting F16 fighter canopies replaced the venerable 35-to-40-foot (11 to 12 m) deep-vee hulls that had been the sport's top category for twenty years.

In the 1980s, European design became more prominent with Don Shead's aluminium monohulls, Italian manufacturers Picchiotti and CUV, and the James Beard-Clive Curtis Cougar catamarans setting new standards. Fabio Buzzi made a significant technological advance by introducing glass-reinforced polymer hulls, turbo-charged engines, and integral surface drives, with his boats winning numerous championships throughout the 1980s and 1990s.

=== Contemporary Development (1990s–Present) ===
The 1990s saw the emergence of Michael Peter's designs and Tencara and Victory hulls dominating the sport, with Sterling, Lamborghini, Seatek and Mercury sharing the power battle. Modern races are short, track-style events with improved viewing for spectators. The different categories of boats have multiplied beyond the four classes that were common through much of the 1960s, '70s, and '80s.

In recent years, the biggest number of entries in British offshore races have been for the Cowes-Torquay-Cowes and Cowes-Poole-Cowes races held by the British Offshore Powerboat Race Club.

== Governing Bodies and Sanctioning ==
=== International ===
==== Union Internationale Motonautique (UIM) ====
Established in 1922, the Union Internationale Motonautique (UIM) is the world governing body for all powerboating activities. It is fully recognised by the International Olympic Committee (IOC) and is a member of the Association of the IOC Recognised International Sports Federations (ARISF). The UIM has 60 affiliated National Federations and sanctions the sport's premier international championships including Class 1, XCAT World Championship, and various regional series.

=== United States ===
==== American Power Boat Association (APBA) ====
The American Power Boat Association is the traditional sanctioning body for offshore racing in the United States, founded shortly after 1904. The organisation sanctions the APBA Offshore National Series and works with various race producers including Race World Offshore for major events.

==== International Hot Rod Association (IHRA) ====
In October 2025, the International Hot Rod Association, traditionally a drag racing sanctioning body, acquired Powerboat P1 USA/P1 Offshore and subsequently purchased the F1 Powerboat Racing tunnel boat series in December 2025. The organisation announced a $2 million prize purse for its 2026 offshore racing series and an additional $500,000 for its domestic tunnel boat championship, representing the largest financial commitment in American offshore racing history. IHRA appointed Tommy Thomassie as Executive Vice President and Director of Powerboating in December 2025.

==== Race World Offshore (RWO) ====
Race World Offshore is a leading race producer and promoter of world-class offshore powerboat racing events in the United States. Based in Key West, Florida, RWO produces several major events including Michigan City, Clearwater, and the Key West World Championships. Following discussions with APBA, RWO returned to APBA sanctioning for 2026 after operating under World Powerboat Racing Association sanction in 2025.

==== Offshore Powerboat Association (OPA) ====
The New Jersey-based Offshore Powerboat Association functions as both sanctioning body and race producer for events along the eastern seaboard, including races in Atlantic City, Freeport, and Lake Hopatcong.

=== United Kingdom ===
==== British Powerboat Racing Club (BPRC) ====
The BPRC organises traditional offshore races including the historic Cowes-Torquay-Cowes event, which has run since 1961.

==== United Kingdom Offshore Powerboat Racing Association (UKOPRA) ====
Founded in 2017 and operational since 2018, UKOPRA serves as a sanctioning authority for offshore powerboat racing in the United Kingdom. The organisation manages the UK Offshore Powerboat Championship, sets safety standards, manages race rules, and supports the development of the sport nationwide. UKOPRA races take place along the South Coast of England in genuine offshore conditions.

== International Championships ==
=== UIM Class 1 World Powerboat Championship ===
The Class 1 World Powerboat Championship represents the pinnacle of international offshore racing. The technology of Class 1 has advanced considerably since the class was first sanctioned by the UIM in 1964. Shortly after its advent, Americans Jim Wynne, Dick Bertram and Don Aronow supported technological advancement.

In the 1980s, European design became more prominent with Don Shead's aluminium monohulls, Italian manufacturers Picchiotti and CUV, and the James Beard-Clive Curtis Cougar catamarans. Fabio Buzzi made a large technological advance by introducing glass-reinforced polymer hulls, turbo-charged engines, and integral surface drives. The 1990s saw the emergence of Michael Peter's designs and Tencara and Victory hulls dominate, with Sterling, Lamborghini, Seatek and Mercury sharing the power battle.

Weighing around five tonnes, each boat in the Class 1 fleet is approximately 12-14 metres in length, 3.5 metres wide, and constructed using composite materials. All boats were catamarans from the mid-1980s until 2019, when monohulls were permitted again.

Class 1 racing has been conducted in the United States in recent years, with Powerboat P1 USA holding the UIM Class 1 World Championship rights from 2020 through 2025 and staging events in Florida, Indiana, Wisconsin and other American venues.

=== UIM XCAT World Championship ===
The UIM XCAT World Championship, formerly known as Class III racing, represents one of the most thrilling disciplines within offshore powerboat racing. The series was conceived in 2006 during a flight after a Class III race in Doha, when a group of drivers discussed their future with Sid Bensalah of the Dubai International Marine Club.

XCAT was created as a more approachable, economical, and globally entertaining form of ocean-going racing, blending offshore Class 1 and circuit Formula 1 approaches. The championship features 6-litre, twin-engine catamarans capable of exceeding 200 km/h. Each boat is constructed using advanced carbon technology, with two outboard engines providing up to 6,000cc of power. Minimum boat length is 7.6 metres with a maximum of 10 metres.

The UIM took over promotion of the XCAT class in 2017, rebranding it as the UIM XCAT World Championship in 2018. The series typically features 8-10 rounds annually, with races primarily held in the Middle East, Mediterranean, and occasionally Europe and Asia. The 2025 season featured rounds in Fujairah, Kuwait, and Dubai.

One of XCAT's success factors is its containerisation system, which reduces transportation costs for teams by up to 80% compared to other offshore racing models. The championship typically attracts fields of 10-12 boats from multiple nations.

== British Offshore Powerboat Racing ==
=== Historic Events ===
==== Cowes-Torquay-Cowes ====
The Cowes-Torquay-Cowes race was launched by Sir Max Aitken, 2nd Baronet, as the first offshore powerboat race in Europe in 1961. It is the longest-running offshore powerboat race in the world. Initially sponsored by the Daily Express newspaper, its success encouraged several countries in Europe and the Middle East to follow suit, introducing offshore powerboat racing to the rest of the world outside the United States.

In 1964, the Union Internationale Motonautique introduced the World Championship and the Sam Griffith Memorial Trophy, a memorial to Sam Griffith, the American founder of modern offshore racing. To qualify as a championship heat, the race format was changed so that instead of finishing at Torquay, the fleet returns to Cowes, a pattern that remains today.

The race is organised by the British Powerboat Racing Club, with Martin Levi, son of powerboat designer Sonny Levi, taking over as Event Director in 2016.

==== The Needles Trophy ====
The Needles Trophy was first presented in 1932 and awarded annually until 1938, then resumed intermittently from 1951-1956 and continuously from 1967-1989.

The trophy is a solid silver sculpture of the Needles Lighthouse and was inaugurated by the Royal Motor Yacht Club.

==== The Cornish 100 ====
A Class 3 offshore open cockpit race held between 1964 and 1968 between Falmouth and Plymouth, covering approximately 100 miles. Notable winners included Tommy Sopwith in 1965 and Fiona Gore in 1968.

=== UKOPRA Championship ===
The UKOPRA Championship, organised by the United Kingdom Offshore Powerboat Racing Association, has run annually since 2018. The championship features multiple classes of racing (Class 1, 2, 3B, 3C, 3D, 3E, and 4) competing in events along the South Coast of England.

UKOPRA events include the Poole Bay 100, Portland Powerboat Race, and various other rounds at venues including Torquay, Lymington, and the Solent. The organisation sets comprehensive safety standards and technical regulations for all competing boats and crews.

=== Round Britain Powerboat Race ===
The Round Britain Powerboat Race has been run on three occasions, representing one of the most challenging endurance events in offshore powerboat racing.

==== 1969: Daily Telegraph – BP Round Britain Race ====
Covering 1,459 miles divided into 10 racing stages, the race was won by Avenger Too, crewed by Timo Mäkinen, Pascoe Watson and Brian Hendicott, with a total time just over 39 hours, representing an average speed of 37.1 knots sustained over 1,381 nautical miles.

==== 1984: Everest Double Glazing Round Britain Race ====
The 1,400-mile race was won by Fabio Buzzi's White Iveco, a single-step monohull powered by four Iveco diesels. Colin Gervase-Brazier's The Legend finished second, with Renato della Valle's Ego Lamborghini third.

==== 2008: Fiat Powertrain Round Britain Race ====
Organised by Mike Lloyd after a 24-year hiatus, the race attracted 47 boats for the eight-leg, ten-day event. The Greek team of Vassilis Pateras in Blue FPT won overall, with the Norwegian boat Lionhead second and Swedish boat Vilda third.

The 2008 race is likely to remain the last Round Britain race due to strong environmental opposition around the UK coast.

== Safety and Technical Regulations ==
Offshore powerboat racing is inherently dangerous, with participants required to meet stringent safety requirements. The UIM and national sanctioning bodies including APBA, IHRA, and UKOPRA maintain comprehensive safety regulations.

UKOPRA regulations require all crew members to wear racing vests with inherent buoyancy of at least 150 Newton fitted with collars during all racing and practice sessions. Boats must meet specific construction standards, carry emergency equipment, and undergo scrutineering before competition.

Modern offshore racing places significant emphasis on rescue and safety support, with dedicated safety boats, medical personnel, and emergency response protocols mandatory at all sanctioned events.

== Environmental Considerations ==
The sport has faced increasing environmental scrutiny, particularly in Europe. The UIM XCAT World Championship has committed to environmental protection with boats using fuel that produces 80% less emissions and dramatic reductions in aromatic hydrocarbons, poly-aromatic hydrocarbons and olefins harmful to underwater fauna.

The cancellation of the planned Venture Cup long-distance races in 2013 and 2015-2016 was partly attributed to environmental concerns and funding difficulties. The likelihood of future Round Britain races has been diminished by strong environmental opposition.

== Economic Impact ==
Prize money in offshore powerboat racing has increased substantially in recent years. The IHRA's $2 million purse for its 2026 offshore series represents the largest financial commitment in American offshore racing history. The organisation also announced $250,000 for the Key West World Championship and an additional $500,000 for its F1 tunnel boat series.

The XCAT World Championship historically offered a total prize fund of $1.5 million split among top finishers. Class 1 racing involves significant financial investment, with boats costing millions and team budgets running into seven figures annually.

== See also ==
- F1 Powerboat World Championship
- Inshore powerboat racing
- Hydroplane racing
