= Ghaith =

Arabic male given name

- Gender: Male
- Language: Arabic

Origin
- Meaning: Rain, rainfall

Other names
- Variant form: Ghayth

Ghaith (Arabic: غيث) or Ghayth is an Arabic male name meaning "rain" that is derived from the linguistic root غ-ي-ث. It also carries connotations of deliverance, aid, and relief, hence it also having broader meanings of "rainfall" and "life giving rainfall". For this reason, it holds significance in many Arab countries, where the climate can become very hot and arid. Both forms of the name also exist as a surname.

Notable people with the name include:

== Given name ==
=== Ghaith ===
- Ghaith Ouahabi (born 2003), Tunisian footballer
- Ghaith Jumaa (born 1988), Qatari footballer who plays as a goalkeeper
- Ghaith Abdul-Ahad (born 1975), Iraqi journalist known for documenting various wars and conflicts for high-profile newspapers
- Ghaith Pharaon (1940–2017), Saudi fugitive financier and businessman who founded Attock Group, Attock Cement, and at one time an investor in the Bank of Credit and Commerce International (BCCI)

=== Ghayth ===
- Ghayth Armanazi (born 1943), Syrian media specialist and former diplomat of the Arab league

== Surname ==
=== Ghaith ===
- Adnan Ghaith (born 1970s), Palestinian politician and member of Fatah

=== Al-Ghaith ===
- Issa Al-Ghaith (born 1972), Saudi Islamic scholar, judge, author, and activist

== Other variants ==
Due to the nature of Arabic naming conventions, these do not qualify as surnames the same way as in English despite being at the end.

=== Abu Ghaith ===
- Sulaiman Abu Ghaith (born 1965), a Kuwaiti regarded as one of the spokesmen for Al-Qaeda
