= Syrians in Saudi Arabia =

- A map showing Syria in orange and Saudi Arabia in green

Total population
- 449,314 (2022 census)

Regions with significant populations
- Riyadh, Jeddah, Dammam

Languages
- Arabic (Syrian Arabic), English

Religion
- Islam, Christianity

As of September 2015, the number of Syrians in Saudi Arabia is estimated to be around 449,000 and consists mainly of temporary foreign workers. According to the United Nations High Commissioner for Refugees' representative for the Persian Gulf region, Syrian nationals are referred to as "Arab brothers and sisters in distress". Saudi Arabia does not consider Syrians as refugees. They are provided access to education and healthcare, and allowed to take up jobs like other expats.

== Refugees ==
As of September 2015, the flow of refugees to the European Union has increased significantly, and there is a rise in criticism of some Muslim nations for allegedly accepting few refugees. The Syrian Civil War forced millions to flee their homes in search of safety. Saudi Arabia, as a rich country, was heavily criticized for not offering land to Syrian refugees – it only offers resettlement for asylum-seekers whose families already reside in Saudi Arabia.

=== Total number ===
The CIA World Factbook estimated that as of 2013, foreign nationals living in Saudi Arabia made up about 21% of the population. The total number of Syrians in Saudi Arabia was 100,000 before the start of Syrian Civil War.

Saudi Arabia, like all the other Arab states of the Persian Gulf, is not a signatory to the 1951 United Nations Refugee Convention, which mandates member states to protect refugees within their country. However, according to a Saudi official, Saudi Arabia has issued residency permits to 100,000 Syrians. On the other hand, the BBC claims, "Most successful cases are Syrians already in the Gulf states extending their stays, or those entering because they have family there," and, "No Syrians claiming asylum have been taken in by Saudi Arabia or other wealthy Gulf countries."

Syrians in Saudi Arabia include migrants from Syria to Saudi Arabia and their descendants. The number of Syrians in Saudi Arabia (referred to as "Arab brothers and sisters in distress") was estimated to be at around 2,500,000 people in August 2015 and consisted mainly of temporary foreign workers. However, a UNHCR official stated that the number of Syrians in Saudi Arabia was around 700,000.

=== Conflicting versions ===
Saudi foreign ministry officials claim that the nation has received nearly 2.5 million Syrians since 2011. However, the BBC reports that Saudi Arabia has let in 500,000 Syrian refugees since 2011, while Arab News reported that Saudi Arabia was already home to 500,000 Syrians. Saudi Arabia claims to have granted 100,000 Syrians residency. An official from Saudi Arabia's Ministry of Foreign Affairs stated that Saudi Arabia "made it a point not to deal with them as 'refugees'."

The Huffington Post has criticized the international community for saying that Saudi Arabia has taken no refugees. The newspaper claimed that outlets in the US have exploited a technicality used by the UN to count Syrian refugees, and that it is more plausible that 500,000 Syrian refugees are currently in Saudi Arabia.

== Notable figures ==
- Wafic Saïd, billionaire businessman and philanthropist.
- Adnan Khashoggi, billionaire businessman, and arms dealer, his mother was of Syrian descent
- Mansour Ojjeh, billionaire entrepreneur.
- Akram Ojjeh, businessman and founder of Techniques d'Avant Garde.
- Reem Osman, Syrian healthcare executive based in Saudi Arabia. She serves as Vice Chairwoman of the Saudi German Health in the United Arab Emirates.
- Ghaith Pharaon, businessman who owned Attock Group and Attock Cement.
- Karim Ojjeh, businessman and racing driver.
- Yusuf Yasin, journalist and politician who served in various capacities during the reign of King Abdulaziz and King Saud.
- Sadad Ibrahim Al Husseini, leading oil and gas industry expert.
- Ali Al-Tantawi, an Islamic scholar and a literary figure.
- Nadia Awni Sakati, a paediatrician who described three rare disorders in children
- Medhat Sheikh el-Ard, king Abdulaziz's doctor and a diplomat.
- Maarouf al-Dawalibi, a Syrian politician and twice the prime minister of Syria. He also served as an adviser to several Saudi kings.
- Muhammad Ali Al-Sabuni, a notable Muslim scholar
- Muhammad Dhiyauddin Al-Sabuni, also known as the poet of Taibah
- Abdelrazaq Al Hussain
- Ahmad Deeb
- Jehad Al-Hussain
- Mahmoud Maowas
- Mohamad Hamwi
- Mohammed Estanbeli
- Mohannad Ibrahim
- Muhammad Surur
- Omar Al Soma
- Raja Rafe
- Wael Ayan
- Yahya Hawwa

== See also ==
- Saudi Arabia–Syria relations
- Syrian diaspora
- Refugees of the Syrian Civil War
- Foreign workers in Saudi Arabia
- Migrant workers in the Gulf Cooperation Council region
