= Attock (disambiguation) =

Attock is a city in Punjab, Pakistan.

Attock may also refer to:

== Places ==
- Attock District, a district of Pakistan.
- Attock Tehsil, a tehsil of Attock district.
- Attock Khurd, an ancient town in Punjab, Pakistan

== Companies ==
- Attock Refinery Limited, crude oil refinery company in Pakistan.
- Attock Petroleum Limited, oil marketing company in Pakistan.
- Attock Group, group of companies in Pakistan.

== Transport ==
- Attock Passenger, a name of train.
- Attock City Junction railway station, a name of railway station in Pakistan.
- Attock Khurd railway station, a name of railway station in Attock Khurd.

== Sports ==
- Attock Group cricket team, a local cricket team.

== People ==
- Frederick Attock (1846–1902), English railway carriage superintendent
- Martin Atock (1834–1901, formerly Martin Attock), English railway engineer
