= Tal Block =

Oil field in Kohat District, Pakistan

- Country: Pakistan
- Region: Khyber Pakhtunkhwa
- Location: near Kohat District
- Offshore/onshore: onshore

Field history
- Discovery: 2002
- Start of production: 2002

Production
- Current production of oil: 17,000 barrels per day (~8.5×10^{5} t/a)
- Current production of gas: 7,000×10^{6} cu ft/d (200×10^{6} m^{3}/d)

Tal Block is an oil and gas field located in Kohat District, Pakistan. The field accounts for 20% of Pakistan's oil production, amounting to 17,000 barrels per day. Six discoveries have been made in the block, the first in 2002 and the most recent in 2011. Oil & Gas Development Company, Pakistan Petroleum and Pakistan Oilfields hold ownership stakes of 28, 28 and 21 percent, respectively, in Tal Block. The field has 55 percent as the success ratio of discovery in Tal Block, compared to 33 percent in other areas. MOL Group is responsible for making further discoveries and has added 145 million cubic feet of natural gas per day.
