= 2005 F1 Powerboat World Championship =

2005 F1 Powerboat World Championship
Previous:	2004	Next:	2006

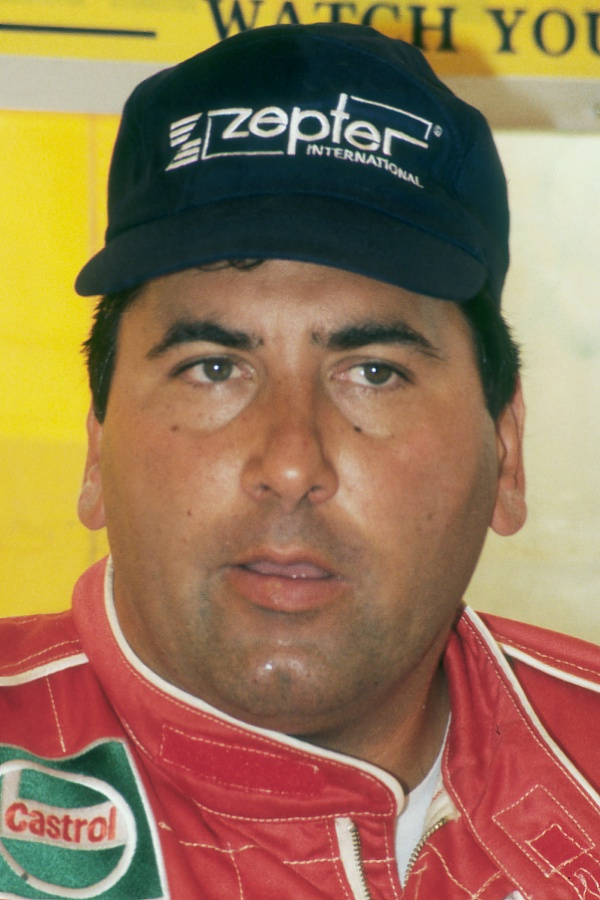
Guido Cappellini won his ninth championship in 2005.

The 2005 UIM F1 World Championship was the 22nd season of Formula 1 Powerboat racing. The calendar consisted of six events, beginning in Portimão, Portugal on 22 May 2005, and ending in Sharjah, UAE on 16 December 2005. Guido Cappellini, driving for the Tamoil F1 Team, clinched his ninth world title, re-taking the championship from defending champion Scott Gillman.

== Teams and drivers ==
Team	Hull	Engine	No.	Race drivers	Rounds
(United Arab Emirates) Emirates F1 Team	DAC	Mercury 2.5 V6	1	(United States) Scott Gillman	All
(United Arab Emirates) Emirates F1 Team	DAC	Mercury 2.5 V6	2	(United Arab Emirates) Thani Al Qamzi	All
(Italy) Team Green	DAC	Mercury 2.5 V6	3	(Saudi Arabia) Laith Pharaon	All
(Italy) Team Green	DAC	Mercury 2.5 V6	4	(Italy) Massimo Roggiero	All
(Italy) Rainbow Team	DAC	Mercury 2.5 V6	7	(Italy) Fabrizio Bocca	All
(Italy) Rainbow Team	DAC	Mercury 2.5 V6	8	(Italy) Valerio Lagiannella	1–2
(Italy) Rainbow Team	DAC	Mercury 2.5 V6	8	(Qatar) Mohamed Al Ali	3–6
(Portugal) Atlantic Team	DAC	Mercury 2.5 V6	9	(Italy) Marco Gambi	All
(Portugal) Atlantic Team	Burgess	Mercury 2.5 V6	10	(Portugal) Duarte Benavente	All
(Italy) DanIta Racing Team	DAC	Mercury 2.5 V6	11	(Denmark) Gert Ladefoged	1, 4–5
(Italy) DanIta Racing Team	Moore	Mercury 2.5 V6	11	(France) Cédric Deguisne	2
(Italy) DanIta Racing Team	DAC	Mercury 2.5 V6	11	(United Arab Emirates) Arif Al Zafeen	3
(Italy) DanIta Racing Team	Moore	Mercury 2.5 V6	12	(France) Cédric Deguisne	1
(Italy) DanIta Racing Team	DAC	Mercury 2.5 V6	12	(Norway) Rolf Magne Sunde	2–4
(Italy) DanIta Racing Team	DAC	Mercury 2.5 V6	12	(United States) Chris Fairchild	5
(Italy) Singha F1 Racing Team	Blaze	Mercury 2.5 V6	14	(Italy) Massimiliano Moreschi	All
(Italy) Singha F1 Racing Team	Blaze	Mercury 2.5 V6	15	(Italy) Francesco Cantando	All
(France) Ligier Charente Maritime	DAC	Mercury 2.5 V6	17	(France) Philippe Dessertenne	All
(France) Ligier Charente Maritime	Moore	Mercury 2.5 V6	18	(France) Philippe Chiappe	All
(Australia) XPV Racing	GTR	Mercury 2.5 V6	19	(Australia) Bob Trask	All
(Australia) XPV Racing	DAC	Mercury 2.5 V6	20	(Australia) David Trask	All
(Finland) Seliö F1 Powerboat	BaBa	Mercury 2.5 V6	25	(Finland) Sami Seliö	All
(Finland) Seliö F1 Powerboat	DAC	Mercury 2.5 V6	26	(Belgium) Julius Leysen	All
(Italy) Comparato Racing Team	DAC	Mercury 2.5 V6	29	(Italy) Luca Fornasarig	1–2
(Italy) Comparato Racing Team	DAC	Mercury 2.5 V6	29	(Italy) Luigi Roberto	3–6
(Italy) Comparato Racing Team	DAC	Mercury 2.5 V6	30	(Italy) Fabio Comparato	All
(United Kingdom) ACE Racing	Dragon	Mercury 2.5 V6	31	(United Kingdom) Andy Elliott	All
(Italy) Tamoil F1 Team	DAC	Mercury 2.5 V6	43	(Italy) Guido Cappellini	All
(Italy) Tamoil F1 Team	DAC	Mercury 2.5 V6	44	(Germany) Fabian Kalsow	All
(Italy) Tamoil F1 Team	DAC	Mercury 2.5 V6	47	(Italy) Ivan Brigada	2
(France) Team ART Boat	DAC	Mercury 2.5 V6	71	(France) Bruno Corsin	2

Key
Regular boat/driver
Boat ineligible for team points

== Season calendar ==
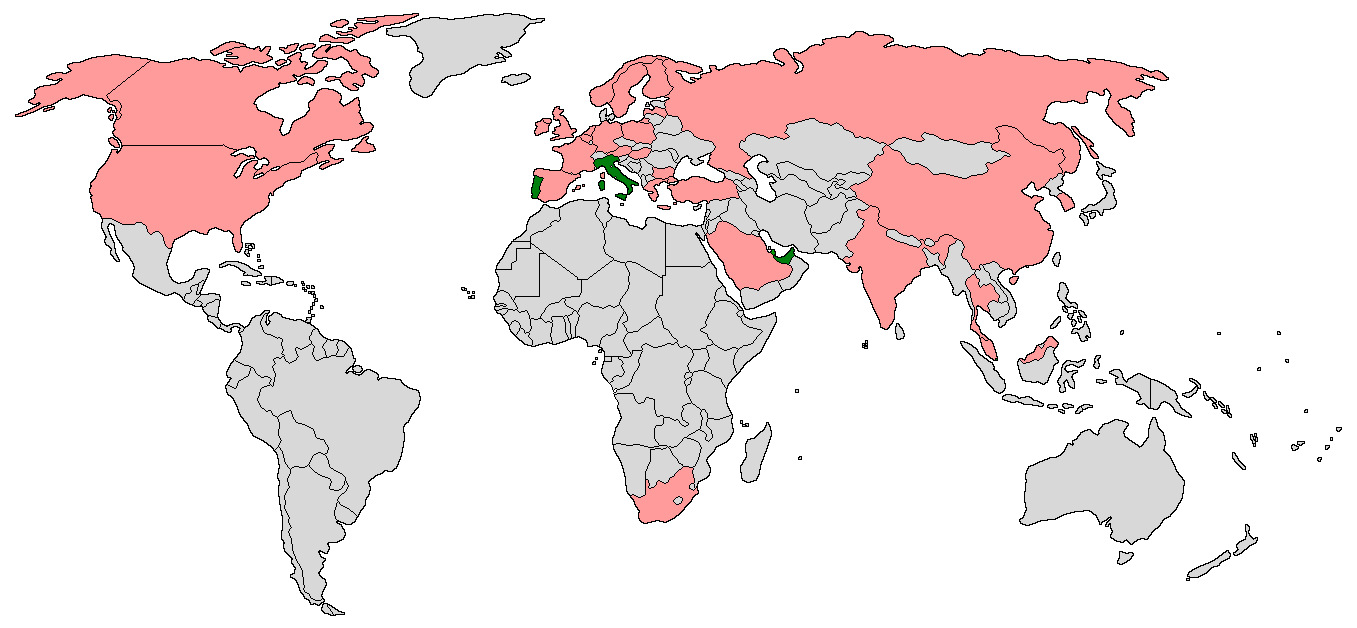
Countries that hosted F1 Powerboat races in 2005, shown in green. Former host nations are shown in pink.

Round	Race title	Date	Circuit location	Race winner	Hull/Engine
1	7th Grand Prix of Portugal	22 May	Portimão	(Italy) Guido Cappellini	DAC/Mercury
2	9th Grand Prix of Italy	10 July	Como	(Italy) Guido Cappellini	DAC/Mercury
3	6th Grand Prix of Singapore	18 September	Singapore	(Italy) Francesco Cantando	Blaze/Mercury
4	1st Grand Prix of Qatar	19 November	Doha	(Italy) Guido Cappellini	DAC/Mercury
5	(United Arab Emirates) 13th Grand Prix of Abu Dhabi	9 December	Abu Dhabi	(United States) Scott Gillman	DAC/Mercury
6	(United Arab Emirates) 6th Grand Prix of Sharjah	16 December	Sharjah	(Italy) Guido Cappellini	DAC/Mercury

== Results and standings ==
Points were awarded to the top 10 classified finishers. A maximum of two boats per team were eligible for points in the teams' championship.

Position	**1st**	**2nd**	**3rd**	**4th**	**5th**	**6th**	**7th**	**8th**	**9th**	**10th**
Points	20	15	12	9	7	5	4	3	2	1

=== Drivers standings ===
Pos	Driver	POR (Portugal)	ITA (Italy)	SIN^{†} (Singapore)	QAT (Qatar)	ABU (United Arab Emirates)	SHA (United Arab Emirates)	Points
1	(Italy) Guido Cappellini	**1**	**1**	**Ret**	1	3	1	92
2	(Finland) Sami Seliö	12	2	2	3	Ret	2	49.5
3	(United States) Scott Gillman	2	Ret	Ret	**Ret**	**1**	**5**	42
4	(Italy) Fabio Comparato	3	6	4	4	Ret	4	39.5
5	(France) Philippe Dessertenne	4	Ret	3	2	4	Ret	39
6	(Saudi Arabia) Laith Pharaon	5	5	5	Ret	2	DNS	32.5
7	(Italy) Francesco Cantando	Ret	4	1	Ret	10	3	32
8	(Australia) David Trask	8	7	6	5	DNS	Ret	16.5
9	(United Kingdom) Andy Elliott	Ret	3	Ret	Ret	Ret	DNS	12
10	(Italy) Massimo Roggiero	DNS	Ret	7	6	6	Ret	12
11	(United Arab Emirates) Thani Al Qamzi	7	9	10	Ret	11	6	11.5
12	(Belgium) Julius Leysen	Ret	Ret	Ret	9	8	7	9
13	(Portugal) Duarte Benavente	10	8	12	7	DNS	Ret	8
14	(Denmark) Gert Ladefoged	15			DNS	5		7
15	(Italy) Fabrizio Bocca	9	10	Ret	Ret	7	Ret	7
16	(Germany) Fabian Kalsow	DNS	16	11	8	Ret	8	6
17	(France) Cédric Deguisne	6	18					5
18	(Qatar) Mohamed Al Ali			DSQ	Ret	9	9	4
19	(Italy) Luigi Roberto			8	Ret	DNS	Ret	1.5
20	(Norway) Rolf Magne Sunde		DNS	9	Ret			1
21	(Australia) Bob Trask	Ret	DSQ	Ret	11	Ret	10	1
22	(Italy) Marco Gambi	Ret	13	Ret	10	Ret	Ret	1
23	(France) Philippe Chiappe	13	12	Ret	DNS	Ret	11	0
24	(Italy) Massimiliano Moreschi	11	Ret	Ret	Ret	Ret	Ret	0
25	(Italy) Ivan Brigada		11					0
26	(Italy) Luca Fornasarig	14	14					0
27	(Italy) Valerio Lagiannella	DSQ	15					0
28	(France) Bruno Corsin		17					0
29	(United States) Chris Fairchild					Ret		0
30	(United Arab Emirates) Arif Al Zafeen			DSQ				0

Key
Colour	Result
Gold	Winner
Silver	Second place
Bronze	Third place
Green	Other points position
Blue	Other classified position
Blue	Not classified, finished (NC)
Purple	Not classified, retired (Ret)
Red	Did not qualify (DNQ)
Red	Did not pre-qualify (DNPQ)
Black	Disqualified (DSQ)
White	Did not start (DNS)
White	Race cancelled (C)
Blank	Did not practice (DNP)
Blank	Excluded (EX)
Blank	Did not arrive (DNA)
Blank	Withdrawn (WD)
Blank	Did not enter (cell empty)
Text formatting	Meaning
**Bold**	Pole position
Italics	Fastest lap

† Half points were awarded at the Grand Prix of Singapore as less than 70% of the race distance had been completed.

=== Teams standings ===
Only boats with results eligible for points counting towards the teams' championship are shown here.

Pos	Team	Boat No.	POR (Portugal)	ITA (Italy)	SIN^{†} (Singapore)	QAT (Qatar)	ABU (United Arab Emirates)	SHA (United Arab Emirates)	Points
1	(Italy) Tamoil F1 Team	43	**1**	**1**	**Ret**	1	3	1	98
1	(Italy) Tamoil F1 Team	44	DNS	16	11	8	Ret	8	98
2	(Finland) Seliö F1 Powerboat	25	12	2	2	3	Ret	2	58.5
2	(Finland) Seliö F1 Powerboat	26	Ret	Ret	Ret	9	8	7	58.5
3	(United Arab Emirates) Emirates F1 Team	1	2	Ret	Ret	**Ret**	**1**	**5**	53.5
3	(United Arab Emirates) Emirates F1 Team	2	7	9	10	Ret	11	6	53.5
4	(Italy) Team Green	3	5	5	5	Ret	2	DNS	44.5
4	(Italy) Team Green	4	DNS	Ret	7	6	6	Ret	44.5
5	(Italy) Comparato Racing Team	29	14	14	8	Ret	DNS	Ret	41
5	(Italy) Comparato Racing Team	30	3	6	4	4	Ret	4	41
6	(France) Ligier Charente Maritime	17	4	Ret	3	2	4	Ret	39
6	(France) Ligier Charente Maritime	18	13	12	Ret	DNS	Ret	11	39
7	(Italy) Singha F1 Racing Team	14	11	Ret	Ret	Ret	Ret	Ret	32
7	(Italy) Singha F1 Racing Team	15	Ret	4	1	Ret	10	3	32
8	(Australia) XPV Racing	19	Ret	DSQ	Ret	11	Ret	10	21
8	(Australia) XPV Racing	20	8	7	6	5	DNS	Ret	21
9	(Italy) DanIta Racing Team	11	15	18	DSQ	DNS	5		13
9	(Italy) DanIta Racing Team	12	6	DNS	9	Ret	Ret		13
10	(United Kingdom) ACE Racing	31	Ret	3	Ret	Ret	Ret	DNS	12
11	(Italy) Rainbow Team	7	9	10	Ret	Ret	7	Ret	11
11	(Italy) Rainbow Team	8	DSQ	15	DSQ	Ret	9	9	11
12	(Portugal) Atlantic Team	9	Ret	13	Ret	10	Ret	Ret	9
12	(Portugal) Atlantic Team	10	10	8	12	7	DNS	Ret	9
13	(France) Team ART Boat	71		17					0

Key
Colour	Result
Gold	Winner
Silver	Second place
Bronze	Third place
Green	Other points position
Blue	Other classified position
Blue	Not classified, finished (NC)
Purple	Not classified, retired (Ret)
Red	Did not qualify (DNQ)
Red	Did not pre-qualify (DNPQ)
Black	Disqualified (DSQ)
White	Did not start (DNS)
White	Race cancelled (C)
Blank	Did not practice (DNP)
Blank	Excluded (EX)
Blank	Did not arrive (DNA)
Blank	Withdrawn (WD)
Blank	Did not enter (cell empty)
Text formatting	Meaning
**Bold**	Pole position
Italics	Fastest lap

† Half points were awarded at the Grand Prix of Singapore as less than 70% of the race distance had been completed.
