= Pharaon (disambiguation) =

Pharaon may refer to:

- Pharaon, a typeface produced by Deberny & Peignot
- Pharaon, a ship in Dumas' novel The Count of Monte Cristo
- Laith Pharaon (born 1968), entrepreneur and motorboat racer
- Rashad Pharaon (1912–1990), Syrian-born Saudi Arabian medical doctor and politician
