= 2006 F1 Powerboat World Championship =

2006 F1 Powerboat World Championship
Previous:	2005	Next:	2007

The 2006 UIM F1 World Championship was the 23rd season of Formula 1 Powerboat racing. The calendar consisted of six events, beginning in Doha, Qatar on 15 April 2006, and ending in Sharjah, UAE on 15 December 2006. Scott Gillman, driving for the Emirates F1 Team, clinched his fourth and ultimately last F1 championship which remains the second highest total in the sport's history.

== Teams and drivers ==
Team	Hull	Engine	No.	Race drivers	Rounds
(Italy) Tamoil F1 Team	DAC	Mercury 2.5 V6	1	(Italy) Guido Cappellini	All
(Italy) Tamoil F1 Team	DAC	Mercury 2.5 V6	2	(Italy) Ivan Brigada	1–3, 5–6
(Italy) Tamoil F1 Team	BaBa	Mercury 2.5 V6	2	(Germany) Fabian Kalsow	4
(Italy) Tamoil F1 Team	BaBa	Mercury 2.5 V6	44	(Germany) Fabian Kalsow	2–3, 5–6
(Italy) Team Green	BaBa; DAC	Mercury 2.5 V6	3	(Saudi Arabia) Laith Pharaon	1–2, 5–6
(Italy) Team Green	BaBa	Mercury 2.5 V6	4	(Italy) Massimo Roggiero	1
(Italy) Team Green	DAC	Mercury 2.5 V6	4	(Italy) Leo Bonelli	2–3
(Italy) Rainbow Team	DAC	Mercury 2.5 V6	7	(Italy) Fabrizio Bocca	All
(Italy) Rainbow Team	DAC	Mercury 2.5 V6	8	(Italy) Valerio Lagiannella	1–2
(Italy) Rainbow Team	DAC	Mercury 2.5 V6	8	(Sweden) Jonas Andersson	3–6
(Italy) Rainbow Team	DAC	Mercury 2.5 V6	41	(Sweden) Jonas Andersson	2
(Italy) Rainbow Team	DAC	Mercury 2.5 V6	71	(Italy) Valerio Lagiannella	3
(Portugal) Atlantic Team	Dragon	Mercury 2.5 V6	9	(United Kingdom) Andy Elliott	All
(Portugal) Atlantic Team	Dragon	Mercury 2.5 V6	10	(Portugal) Duarte Benavente	All
(Italy) Singha Racing Team	Blaze	Mercury 2.5 V6	14	(Italy) Massimiliano Moreschi	All
(Italy) Singha Racing Team	Blaze	Mercury 2.5 V6	15	(Italy) Francesco Cantando	All
(France) CTIC China Team Charente Maritime	DAC	Mercury 2.5 V6	17	(France) Philippe Dessertenne	All
(France) CTIC China Team Charente Maritime	BaBa	Mercury 2.5 V6	18	(France) Philippe Chiappe	All
(France) CTIC China Team Charente Maritime	DAC	Mercury 2.5 V6	81	(China) Peng Lin Wu	2–6
(Australia) XPV Racing	GTR	Mercury 2.5 V6	19	(Australia) Bob Trask	All
(Australia) XPV Racing	GTR	Mercury 2.5 V6	20	(Australia) David Trask	All
(Finland) Red Devil Seliö F1	BaBa	Mercury 2.5 V6	25	(Finland) Sami Seliö	All
(Finland) Red Devil Seliö F1	BaBa	Mercury 2.5 V6	26	(Belgium) Julius Leysen	All
(United Arab Emirates) Emirates F1 Team	DAC	Mercury 2.5 V6	27	(United States) Scott Gillman	All
(United Arab Emirates) Emirates F1 Team	DAC	Mercury 2.5 V6	28	(United Arab Emirates) Thani Al Qamzi	All
(Italy) Comparato Racing Team	Comparato	Mercury 2.5 V6	29	(Italy) Luigi Roberto	All
(Italy) Comparato Racing Team	DAC	Mercury 2.5 V6	30	(Italy) Fabio Comparato	All
(Italy) Comparato Racing Team	Comparato	Mercury 2.5 V6	47	(Sweden) Pierre Lundin	3
(Italy) ASMC Racing	DAC	Mercury 2.5 V6	33	(Italy) Marco Gambi	All
(Italy) ASMC Racing	Blaze	Mercury 2.5 V6	34	(Italy) Franco Leidi	1–3
(Italy) ASMC Racing	DAC	Mercury 2.5 V6	34	(United Arab Emirates) Ahmed Al Hameli	3, 5–6
Qatar Team	BaBa	Mercury 2.5 V6	55	(United States) Jay Price	2–6
Qatar Team	BaBa	Mercury 2.5 V6	56	(Italy) Massimo Roggiero	2–6
Qatar Team	BaBa	Mercury 2.5 V6	96	(Qatar) Mohamed Al Ali	1

Key
Regular boat/driver
Boat ineligible for team points

== Season calendar ==
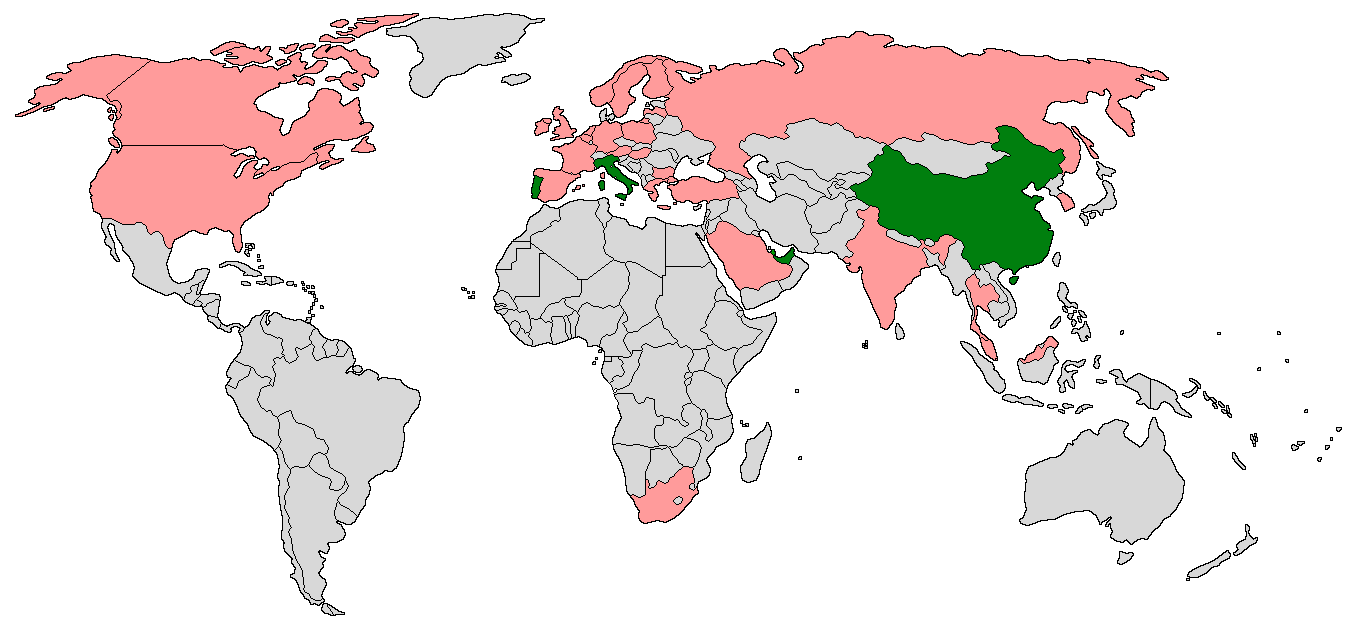
Countries that hosted F1 Powerboat races in 2006, shown in green. Former host nations are shown in pink.

A six-race calendar was maintained from the 2005 season, with just one change: the incident-packed race from the previous year in Singapore was replaced by the return of China to the schedule after a year's absence. The venue chosen was Chongzhou where F1 would visit for the first time. The 2006 season marked a watershed for Italy's presence in the sport. Whilst Italian teams and drivers have gone on to participate in the series for years to follow, 2006 is the last time an Italian round has featured on the calendar to date. It was therefore somewhat fitting that on the 25th anniversary of the first championship season the venue was Lake Como where the first F1 race, and the first Grand Prix of Italy, had been held in 1981.

Round	Race title	Date	Circuit location	Race winner	Hull/Engine
1	2nd Grand Prix of Qatar	15 April	Doha	(Italy) Ivan Brigada	DAC/Mercury
2	8th Grand Prix of Portugal	20 May	Portimão	(Italy) Guido Cappellini	DAC/Mercury
3	10th Grand Prix of Italy	16 July	Como	(Italy) Guido Cappellini	DAC/Mercury
4	5th Grand Prix of China	5 October	Chongzhou	(United States) Scott Gillman	DAC/Mercury
5	(United Arab Emirates) 14th Grand Prix of Abu Dhabi	8 December	Abu Dhabi	(Italy) Guido Cappellini	DAC/Mercury
6	(United Arab Emirates) 7th Grand Prix of Sharjah	15 December	Sharjah	(United Arab Emirates) Thani Al Qamzi	DAC/Mercury

== Results and standings ==
Points were awarded to the top 10 classified finishers. A maximum of two boats per team were eligible for points in the teams' championship.

Position	**1st**	**2nd**	**3rd**	**4th**	**5th**	**6th**	**7th**	**8th**	**9th**	**10th**
Points	20	15	12	9	7	5	4	3	2	1

=== Drivers standings ===
Pos	Driver	QAT (Qatar)	POR (Portugal)	ITA (Italy)	CHN (China)	ABU (United Arab Emirates)	SHA (United Arab Emirates)	Points
1	(United States) Scott Gillman	2	2	Ret	1	2	7	69
2	(Italy) Guido Cappellini	Ret	1	**1**	**6**	**1**	Ret	65
3	(United Arab Emirates) Thani Al Qamzi	4	5	2	Ret	3	**1**	63
4	(Italy) Ivan Brigada	**1**	Ret	Ret		Ret	2	35
5	(Australia) David Trask	DNS	Ret	4	3	DSQ	5	28
6	(Sweden) Jonas Andersson		4	Ret	Ret	5	3	28
7	(Australia) Bob Trask	5	6	Ret	5	Ret	6	24
8	(United States) Jay Price		14	6	2	DNS	DSQ	20
9	(France) Philippe Dessertenne	3	11	12	9	8	8	20
10	(Finland) Sami Seliö	6	**Ret**	Ret	10	6	4	20
11	(France) Philippe Chiappe	8	8	11	7	4	DNS	19
12	(Italy) Fabio Comparato	12	3	10	Ret	7	DNS	17
13	(Italy) Massimo Roggiero	DNS	Ret	3	DNS	Ret	Ret	12
14	(United Kingdom) Andy Elliott	Ret	9	Ret	4	Ret	10	12
15	(Portugal) Duarte Benavente	9	Ret	5	Ret	DSQ	13	9
16	(Germany) Fabian Kalsow		12	8	8	9	14	8
17	(Italy) Francesco Cantando	Ret	7	Ret	Ret	11	11	4
18	(Belgium) Julius Leysen	Ret	13	7	Ret	Ret	15	4
19	(Italy) Massimiliano Moreschi	7	Ret	13	Ret	Ret	Ret	4
20	(United Arab Emirates) Ahmed Al Hameli			DNS		10	9	3
21	(Italy) Fabrizio Bocca	Ret	Ret	9	Ret	Ret	12	2
22	(Italy) Luigi Roberto	11	10	Ret	11	Ret	DNS	1
23	(Saudi Arabia) Laith Pharaon	10	Ret			Ret	Ret	1
24	(China) Peng Lin Wu		DNQ	14	Ret	12	16	0
25	(Italy) Marco Gambi	Ret	Ret	Ret	DNS	Ret	Ret	0
26	(Italy) Valerio Lagiannella	Ret	Ret	DNS				0
27	(Italy) Franco Leidi	Ret	DNQ	DNS				0
28	(Italy) Leo Bonelli		DNQ	Ret				0
29	(Qatar) Mohamed Al Ali	Ret						0
30	(Sweden) Pierre Lundin			Ret				0

Key
Colour	Result
Gold	Winner
Silver	Second place
Bronze	Third place
Green	Other points position
Blue	Other classified position
Blue	Not classified, finished (NC)
Purple	Not classified, retired (Ret)
Red	Did not qualify (DNQ)
Red	Did not pre-qualify (DNPQ)
Black	Disqualified (DSQ)
White	Did not start (DNS)
White	Race cancelled (C)
Blank	Did not practice (DNP)
Blank	Excluded (EX)
Blank	Did not arrive (DNA)
Blank	Withdrawn (WD)
Blank	Did not enter (cell empty)
Text formatting	Meaning
**Bold**	Pole position
Italics	Fastest lap

=== Teams standings ===
Only boats with results eligible for points counting towards the teams' championship are shown here.

Pos	Team	Boat No.	QAT (Qatar)	POR (Portugal)	ITA (Italy)	CHN (China)	ABU (United Arab Emirates)	SHA (United Arab Emirates)	Points
1	(United Arab Emirates) Emirates F1 Team	27	2	2	Ret	1	2	7	132
1	(United Arab Emirates) Emirates F1 Team	28	4	5	2	Ret	3	**1**	132
2	(Italy) Tamoil F1 Team	1	Ret	1	**1**	**6**	**1**	Ret	103
2	(Italy) Tamoil F1 Team	2	**1**	Ret	Ret	8	Ret	2	103
3	(Australia) XPV Racing	19	5	6	Ret	5	Ret	6	52
3	(Australia) XPV Racing	20	DNS	Ret	4	3	DSQ	5	52
4	(France) CTIC China Team Charente Maritime	17	3	11	12	9	8	8	39
4	(France) CTIC China Team Charente Maritime	18	8	8	11	7	4	DNS	39
5	Qatar Team	55		14	6	2	DNS	DSQ	32
5	Qatar Team	56		Ret	3	DNS	Ret	Ret	32
6	(Finland) Red Devil Seliö F1	25	6	**Ret**	Ret	10	6	4	24
6	(Finland) Red Devil Seliö F1	26	Ret	13	7	Ret	Ret	15	24
7	(Italy) Rainbow Team	7	Ret	Ret	9	Ret	Ret	12	21
7	(Italy) Rainbow Team	8	Ret	Ret	Ret	Ret	5	3	21
8	(Portugal) Atlantic Team	9	Ret	9	Ret	4	Ret	10	21
8	(Portugal) Atlantic Team	10	9	Ret	5	Ret	DSQ	13	21
9	(Italy) Comparato Racing Team	29	11	10	Ret	11	Ret	DNS	18
9	(Italy) Comparato Racing Team	30	12	3	10	Ret	7	DNS	18
10	(Italy) Singha Racing Team	14	7	Ret	13	Ret	Ret	Ret	8
10	(Italy) Singha Racing Team	15	Ret	7	Ret	Ret	11	11	8
11	(Italy) ASMC Racing	33	Ret	Ret	Ret	DNS	Ret	Ret	3
11	(Italy) ASMC Racing	34	Ret	DNQ	DNS		10	9	3
12	(Italy) Team Green	3	10	Ret			Ret	Ret	1
12	(Italy) Team Green	4	DNS	DNQ	Ret				1

Key
Colour	Result
Gold	Winner
Silver	Second place
Bronze	Third place
Green	Other points position
Blue	Other classified position
Blue	Not classified, finished (NC)
Purple	Not classified, retired (Ret)
Red	Did not qualify (DNQ)
Red	Did not pre-qualify (DNPQ)
Black	Disqualified (DSQ)
White	Did not start (DNS)
White	Race cancelled (C)
Blank	Did not practice (DNP)
Blank	Excluded (EX)
Blank	Did not arrive (DNA)
Blank	Withdrawn (WD)
Blank	Did not enter (cell empty)
Text formatting	Meaning
**Bold**	Pole position
Italics	Fastest lap
