= National Refinery Limited =

Pakistani oil refinery

- Native name: پالایشگاه قوم محدود
- Type: Public
- Traded as: PSX: NRL; KSE 100 component KSE 30 component
- Industry: Oil refining
- Founded: 1963; 63 years ago
- Headquarters: Karachi, Pakistan
- Area served: Pakistan
- Key people: Asad Hasan (CEO)
- Products: Motor gasoline, kerosene, high speed diesel, jet fuel and LPG
- Revenue: ▲ Rs. 408.074 billion (US$1.5 billion) (2025)
- Operating income: ▲ Rs. −7.696 billion (US$−28 million) (2025)
- Net income: ▲ Rs. −14.866 billion (US$−53 million) (2025)
- Total assets: ▲ Rs. 149.495 billion (US$530 million) (2025)
- Total equity: ▲ Rs. 50.316 billion (US$180 million) (2025)
- Owner: Attock Refinery Limited (25%); Pakistan Oilfields Limited (25%); Islamic Development Bank (15%)
- Number of employees: 912 (2025)
- Parent: Attock Group
- Website: nrlpak.com
- Footnotes; Financials as of 30 June 2025

National Refinery Limited (NRL) is a Pakistani oil refinery and petrochemical complex headquartered in Korangi, Karachi. It is part of the Attock Group and is engaged in the manufacture and sale of fuel products, lubricants, asphalts and BTX aromatics for domestic consumption and export. It is the second largest refinery in Pakistan by crude oil processing capacity and is the only lube base oil producer in the country.

== History ==
=== 1963–1972: Early history ===
National Refinery Limited was incorporated on 19 August 1963 as a public limited company by a consortium of Pakistani industrialists led by Amin Group. In September 1963, NRL signed an agreement with the American International Oil Company for the supply of Iranian crude oil from the Darius offshore field in the Persian Gulf, in exchange for technical assistance and arrangement of a US$10 million loan through the Bank of America.

In 1966, National Refinery commissioned its first lube refinery, designed and constructed by SNAM Progetti of Italy, at a cost of Rs 104 million, with a designed capacity of approximately 3.97 million barrels per annum of crude processing and 533,400 barrels per annum of lube base oils. In August 1966, the refinery was officially inaugurated by then President Ayub Khan.

=== 1972–2005: Nationalisation and capacity expansion ===
In 1972, National Refinery was nationalized under the Economic Reforms Order (ERO) of 1972 by Zulfikar Ali Bhutto. In 1974, it became part of state-owned holding company, State Petroleum Refining & Petrochemical Corporation (PERAC).

In 1977, National Refinery commissioned its hydroskimming fuel refinery, supplied by Industrial Export Import of Romania, with a designed crude processing capacity of 11.39 million barrels per annum at a cost of Rs 607.5 million. A second lube refinery was commissioned in 1985, also supplied by Industrial Export Import of Romania, with an initial capacity of 700,000 tons per annum of lube base oils. In the same year, National Refinery commissioned its BTX (benzene, toluene, xylene) petrochemical unit with a designed capacity of 180,000 barrels per annum. In 1990, the fuel refinery capacity was expanded to 16.5 million barrels per annum and was later increased to 17.49 million barrels per annum, with the two expansion phases involving a combined investment of Rs 673 million.

In November 1998, the Government of Pakistan transferred the administrative control of NRL to the Ministry of Petroleum & Natural Resources. In June 2003, the Government included National Refinery in its privatization programme, proposing the sale of 51% equity and transfer of management control to a private investor.

=== 2005–present: Privatisation and expansion ===
In July 2005, Attock Group acquired majority shareholding of the company through its subsidiaries. Following the acquisition, Pakistan Oilfields Limited and Attock Refinery Limited each held 25% of NRL's shares, while the Islamic Development Bank of Saudi Arabia held an additional 15%.

In 2007, National Refinery commissioned a Diesel Hydro Desulphurisation (DHDS) unit to enable production of Euro II-compliant high-speed diesel, at a cost of approximately Rs 26.82 billion. In the same year, it also commissioned an Isomerisation Unit (Naphtha Block) with a processing capacity of 6,793 barrels per stream day of light naphtha for gasoline production, at a cost of Rs 6.54 billion.

In 2017, the Supreme Court of Pakistan upheld a fine imposed by the State Bank of Pakistan on NRL for failure to make timely payments to Saudi Aramco under a 1998 contract, ordering NRL to pay Rs 305 million to the central bank. The State Bank had acted as sovereign guarantor for payments between NRL and the Saudi crude supplier.

== Operations ==
Installed capacity of National Refinery Limited
Plant / Product	Installed capacity (Bbl/year)
Total crude oil processing	24,570,000
Hydro-skimming fuel refinery (crude)	18,603,000
First lube refinery (crude)	5,967,000
Diesel Hydrotreater (Euro II HSD)*	10,864,225
Isomerization unit (Isomerate)*	2,479,445
Lube base oils (Lube I + Lube II)	1,338,400
BTX aromatics	180,000
Asphalt (tonnes/year)	100,000

The National Refinery complex at Korangi Creek, Karachi, comprises three refineries, two lube refineries and one hydroskimming fuel refinery, along with a BTX petrochemical plant, with a total crude oil processing capacity of approximately 70,000 barrels per stream day. The two lube refineries process reduced crude to produce lube base oils, bitumen, wax and other specialty products, while the fuel refinery produces motor gasoline, kerosene, JP-1 and JP-8 jet fuels, Euro II-grade high-speed diesel, liquefied petroleum gas and furnace oil. Naphtha is exported, while most other products are marketed domestically.
