= King Abdulaziz Center for Cultural Communication =

- Founded: 2003; 23 years ago
- Founder: King Fahad bin AbdulAziz
- Location: Saudi Arabia
- Region served: Saudi Arabia
- Chairman of the Board: Abdulaziz M. Al-Subail
- Vice-Chairman & Secretary-General: Abdullah M. Al-Fawzan
- Website: www.kaccc.org.sa
- Formerly called: King Abdulaziz Center for National Dialogue

The King Abdulaziz Center for Cultural Communication (Arabic: مركز الملك عبدالعزيز للتواصل الحضاري), formerly known as the King Abdulaziz Center for National Dialogue (Arabic: مركز الملك عبدالعزيز للحوار الوطني), has been the "auspices" for the National Dialogue Forum in Saudi Arabia. The center is located in the Saudi capital of Riyadh on the Northern Ring Branch Road.

The National Dialogue Forum was instituted in June 2003 "to debate reform and suggest remedies" following several events: the September 11, 2001 attacks in the US, terrorist attacks inside Saudi Arabia that led to the deaths of over 40 people in 2003, and several "Memorandum of Advice" submitted to the King petitioning him to "acknowledge diverging opinions" in the kingdom. The 70 people appointed by then-Crown Prince Abdullah to the dialogue included Shia, women and some noted liberals—in what one source (The Economist) called "unusually for Saudi Arabia." One analyst (Gilles Kepel) described it as an attempt "to substitute nationalism (wataniyya) for the concept of jihad," among Saudis.

It has been described as "an independent national institution which seeks to strengthen channels of communication and dialogue between Saudi citizens and the different elements and institutions of Saudi society". Its stated aim is "to establish and disseminate the culture of dialogue in society, discuss national issues which affect the life of the Saudi citizen and take part in the development of the nation through enabling the participation of different groups, intellectual tendencies and social institutions through the mechanisms and mediums of dialogue".

== Establishment ==
By late 2003, the kingdom's rulers began more determinedly to deal with political concerns, particularly after al-Qaeda attacks. One such move was then-Crown Prince Abdullah's project to encourage more tolerance for religious diversity and rein in the forces of politico-religious extremism in the kingdom. In the summer of 2003, Abdullah threw his considerable weight behind the creation of a national dialogue that brought leading religious figures together, including a highly publicized meeting attended by the kingdom's preeminent Shi'i scholar Hasan al-Saffar, as well as a group of Sunni clerics who had previously expressed their loathing for the Shi'i minority.

A four-day forum was held in June 2003 at King Abdul Aziz Public Library, chaired by Sheikh Saleh Al-Hussayin (president of the Two Holy Mosques Affairs). One of the forum's recommendations was the establishment of a national dialogue center to act as a think tank. On 3 August 2003, in a televised speech, Crown Prince Abdullah announced that King Fahd had approved the establishment of the King Abdulaziz Center for National Dialogue, to be housed temporarily at the library. In his address, he said the center would become a channel for responsible expression of opinion and help the fight against extremism.

== Vision ==
According to the center's English language homepage, the Center is a "national organization which works to spread the culture of dialogue and establish it as a norm for general conduct on the levels of the individual citizen, the family and society at large reflecting adherence to, and pride in, the Islamic religion. This, in turn, will serve to strengthen the concept and values of good citizenship as well as reinforce the security and unity of the nation".

== Statement of Mission ==
The King Abdulaziz Center for National Dialogue is an independent national organization which seeks to promote and develop channels of intellectual dialogue between Saudi citizens, the different segments of Saudi society, and Saudi institutions. It also aims to establish and diffuse the culture of dialogue within the society. The Center also undertakes the study and discussion of issues of national importance which affect the lives of Saudi citizens, and participates in the advancement of the nation through facilitating the participation of all the different groups, points of view and institutions in Saudi society through dialogue

The objective of the Center was expressed as follows:

The main objective is to combat extremism and foster a pure atmosphere that give[s]

rise to wise positions and illuminating ideas that reject terrorism and terrorist thought … the dialogue will not accept turning freedom into obscene abuse, name calling or

attacking the national and good ulema.

== Goals ==
The Goals of ninth National Forum for Intellectual dialogue dated 25 February 2012 are

1. To strengthen national unity within the framework of the Islamic creed and deepen it by way of constructive dialogue.
2. To participate in fashioning a correct form of Islamic discourse rooted in moderation and justice both within the Kingdom of Saudi Arabia as well as outside it, through constructive dialogue.
3. To deal with social, cultural, political, economic, educational, and other national issues, and to present them through the channels of dialogue.
4. To establish the concept and behavioral norms associated with dialogue within Saudi society in order that dialogue may become a way of life and an accepted method for dealing with a variety of issues.
5. To broaden the participation of the different elements composing Saudi society in national dialogue, and to strengthen the role of the institutions of civil society, in order to realize justice, equality and freedom of expression within the framework of the Islamic Sharia.
6. To encourage national dialogue in conjunction with concerned organizations.
7. To strengthen the channels of communication and intellectual dialogue with organizations and individuals outside the Kingdom of Saudi Arabia.
8. To crystallize a strategic vision of national dialogue and put its results into effect.

== Board of Trustees ==
- Dr. Abdulaziz M. Al-Subail, Chairman of the Board
- Dr. Abdullah M. Al-Fawzan, Vice-Chairman & Secretary-General
- Dr. Ihsan Buhulaiga, Member
- Dr. Saud A. Al-Shammari, Member
- Issa A. Al-Ghaith, Member
- Dr. Zuhair F. Al-Harthi, Member
- Dr. Ahmed Al-Arfaj, Member
- Kowther M. Al-Arbash, Member
- Dr. Ghadah G. Al-Ghunaim, Member
- Dr. Mohammed A. Al-Owein, Member
- Mohammed A. Al-Shareef, Member

== The National Meetings ==
The National Dialogue Forum has become an annual event, taking place in different cities of Saudi Arabia. Each year a topic is selected for discussion, ranging from unity to youth's expectations. At the end of the meetings, recommendations that have no binding force are written in the form of a letter addressed to the King.

- First National Meeting (Riyadh) – National unity tops the agenda. June 2003. 30 representatives of Saudi Islam met in Riyadh for four days. This meeting was notable for being attended only by Islamic clerics, but by religious leaders of the Shia, Sufi, Ismaili, Maliki Muslim communities, not just Wahhabi clerics. (Shafite and Malikite from the Hijaz and the Asir regions, Sufi mystics and Ismailis from the Najran (the zone abutting Yemen), as well as Shiites from the Eastern Province.) A third of the participants were from the sahwa "Awakening", but refusing to attend was Safar Al-Hawali, one of the "Awakening" sheikhs, who protested the inclusion of these `deviants.` Salman al-Ouda, another Awakening sheikh, not only attended but offered Shia leader Sheikh Hassan Al-Saffar, a lift in his car after the meeting.
- Second National Meeting (Makkah) – Fighting religious fanaticism and extremism, Dec 2003 – Jan 2004. The participants discussed the educational system and pressed for it to be overhauled under the supervision of experts in the field. Efforts must be made to cultivate the spirit of tolerance and moderation among members of the new generation. The participants also called on pertinent authorities to monitor negative tendencies among students and to draw up contingency-plans for dealing with them in cooperation with educational institutions.
- Third National Meeting (Madinah) – Women's Rights, 12–14 June 2004.
- Fourth National Meeting (Dhahran) – Young People's Expectations, 7–9 December 2004.
- Fifth National Meeting (Buraydah, Abha, Riyadh) – The National Vision for Dealing with World Cultures (June 2005)
- Sixth National Meeting (Riyadh) – Education: Reality and Ways of Improvement, 28–30 November 2006
- Seventh National Meeting (Qasim) – Work & Employment; Dialogue between Society & Work Related Institutions (2008)
- Eighth National Meeting (Najran) – Health Services: A Dialogue between the Society and Health Institutions (2010)
- Ninth National Meeting (Ha'il) – The Media and Society: Reality and Paths to Development (2011)
- Tenth National Meeting (Asir, Jazan, Baha and Makkah) – “Extremism and its effects on national unity” (2015)

In addition there have been KACND "Cultural Discourse" (Arabic: al-hiwar al-thaqafia) Dialogues in 2009 and 2010, which Mark Thompson describes as an effort to "counter increased apathy that had greeted its most recent service-related National Dialogue Meetings".

== See also ==
- Misk Foundation
- List of things named after Saudi kings
