= 2009 F1 Powerboat World Championship =

2009 F1 Powerboat World Championship
Previous:	2008	Next:	2010

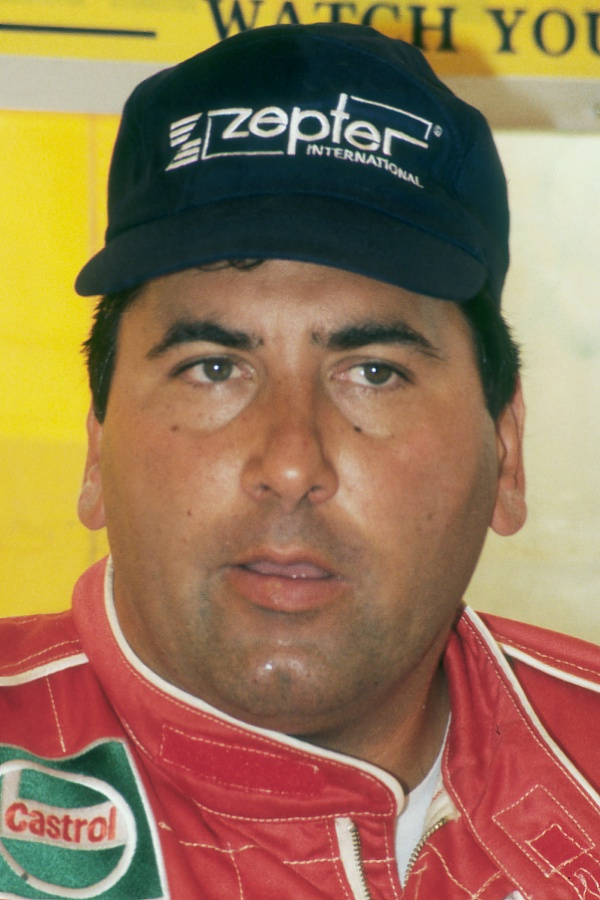
Guido Cappellini won his tenth and final championship in 2009.

The 2009 UIM F1 H_{2}O World Championship was the 26th season of Formula 1 Powerboat racing. The calendar consisted of sixteen races, two per event, beginning in Portimão, Portugal on 4 April 2009, and ending in Sharjah, UAE on 11 December 2009. The format of two races per weekend was a new feature for 2009, introduced by series promoter Nicolo di San Germano at the official pre-season meeting in March. Guido Cappellini, driving for Zepter Team, was drivers' champion, securing an unprecedented tenth championship crown before retiring at the end of the year.

== Teams and drivers ==
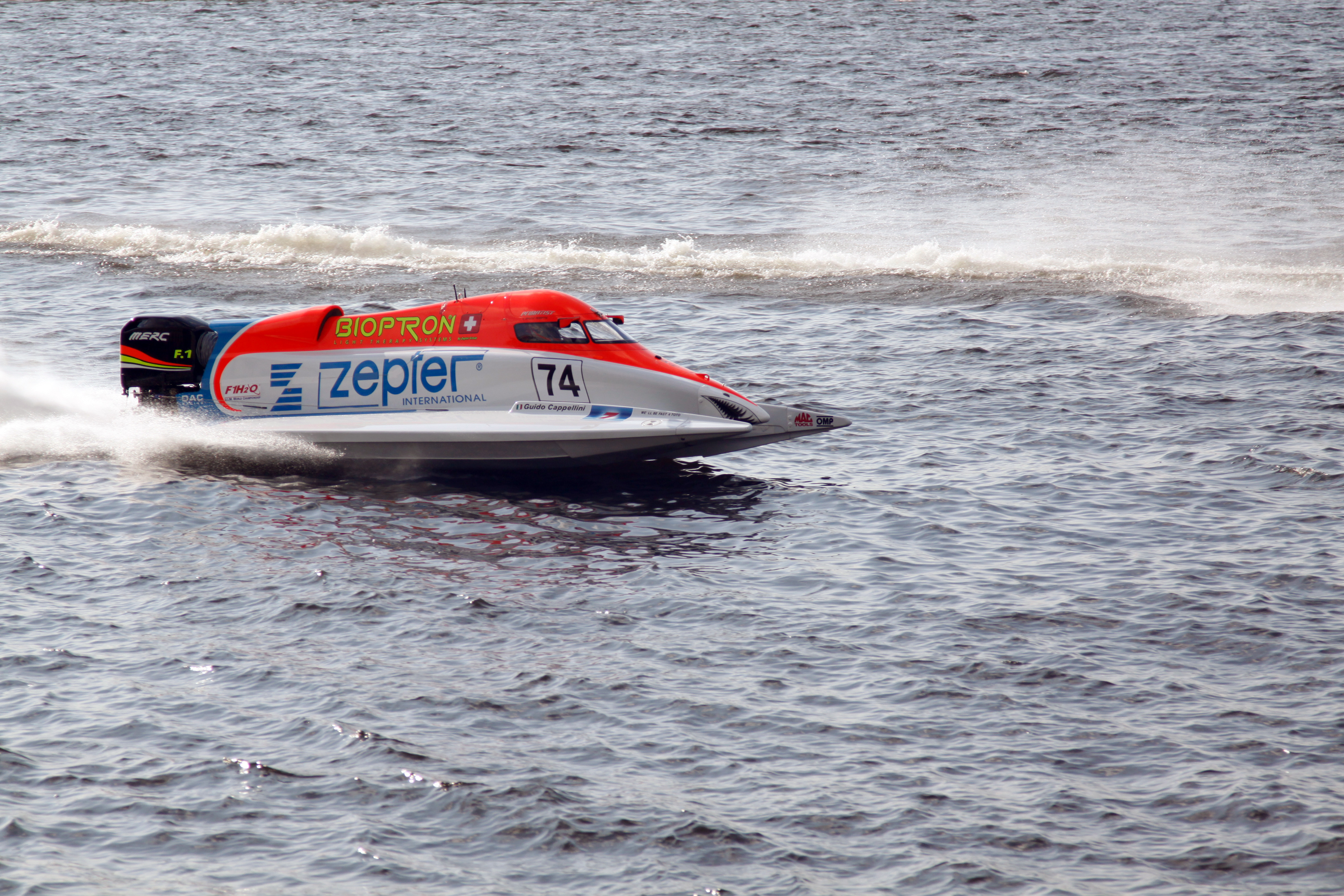
Guido Cappellini at the Grand Prix of Russia in St. Petersburg.

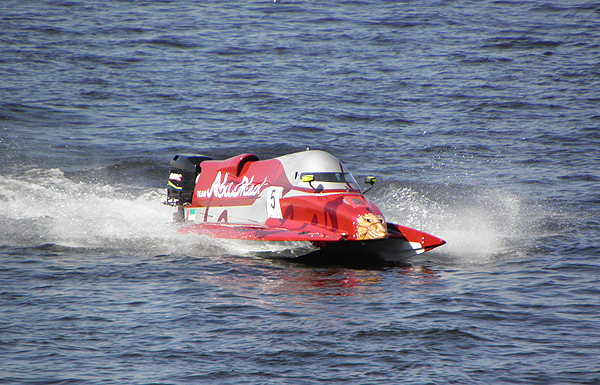
Thani Al Qamzi at the Grand Prix of Russia in St. Petersburg.

Team	Hull	Engine	No.	Race drivers	Rounds
Qatar Team	DAC	Mercury 2.5 V6	1	(United States) Jay Price	All
Qatar Team	BaBa	Mercury 2.5 V6	2	(Italy) Leo Bonelli	1–2
Qatar Team	Dragon	Mercury 2.5 V6	2	(United Kingdom) Andy Elliott	3–6
Qatar Team	Dragon	Mercury 2.5 V6	2	(Australia) Craig Bailey	7–10
Qatar Team	Dragon	Mercury 2.5 V6	2	(United Kingdom) Malcolm Goodman	11–16
(United Arab Emirates) Team Abu Dhabi	DAC	Mercury 2.5 V6	5	(United Arab Emirates) Thani Al Qamzi	All
(United Arab Emirates) Team Abu Dhabi	BaBa	Mercury 2.5 V6	6	(United Arab Emirates) Ahmed Al Hameli	All
(France) CTIC China Team	DAC	Mercury 2.5 V6	7	(Sweden) Pierre Lundin	All
(France) CTIC China Team	BaBa	Mercury 2.5 V6	8	(Germany) Fabian Kalsow	All
(Portugal) F1 Atlantic Team	Moore	Mercury 2.5 V6	9	(France) Philippe Chiappe	All
(Portugal) F1 Atlantic Team	Dragon	Mercury 2.5 V6	10	(Portugal) Duarte Benavente	All
(Finland) Team Mad Croc	BaBa	Mercury 2.5 V6	11	(Finland) Sami Seliö	All
(Finland) Team Mad Croc	BaBa	Mercury 2.5 V6	12	(Italy) Massimo Roggiero	1–4
(Finland) Team Mad Croc	BaBa	Mercury 2.5 V6	12	(Switzerland) Rinaldo Osculati	5–8, 11–16
(Finland) Team Mad Croc	DAC	Mercury 2.5 V6	18	(Italy) Daniele Martignoni	1–6
Team Azerbaijan	DAC	Mercury 2.5 V6	14	(Sweden) Jonas Andersson	All
Team Azerbaijan	DAC	Mercury 2.5 V6	15	(Norway) Marit Strømøy	All
(Italy) Singha F1 Racing Team	DAC	Mercury 2.5 V6	23	(Italy) Marco Gambi	All
(Italy) Singha F1 Racing Team	Blaze	Mercury 2.5 V6	24	(Italy) Francesco Cantando	All
(United Kingdom) Ace Racing	Dragon	Mercury 2.5 V6	50	(United Kingdom) Andy Elliott	1–2
(Italy) 800 Doctor	DAC	Mercury 2.5 V6	69	(Italy) Valerio Lagiannella	All
(Italy) 800 Doctor	BaBa	Mercury 2.5 V6	70	(Italy) Fabio Comparato	All
(Italy) Zepter Team	DAC	Mercury 2.5 V6	74	(Italy) Guido Cappellini	All
(Italy) Zepter Team	DAC	Mercury 2.5 V6	75	(Latvia) Ugis Gross	1–10
(Italy) Zepter Team	DAC	Mercury 2.5 V6	75	(Slovakia) Tomas Cermak	11–16
(Russia) Prox F1 Racing Team	DAC	Mercury 2.5 V6	77	(Russia) Stanislav Kourtsenovsky	3–4

Key
Regular boat/driver
Boat ineligible for
team points

== Season calendar ==
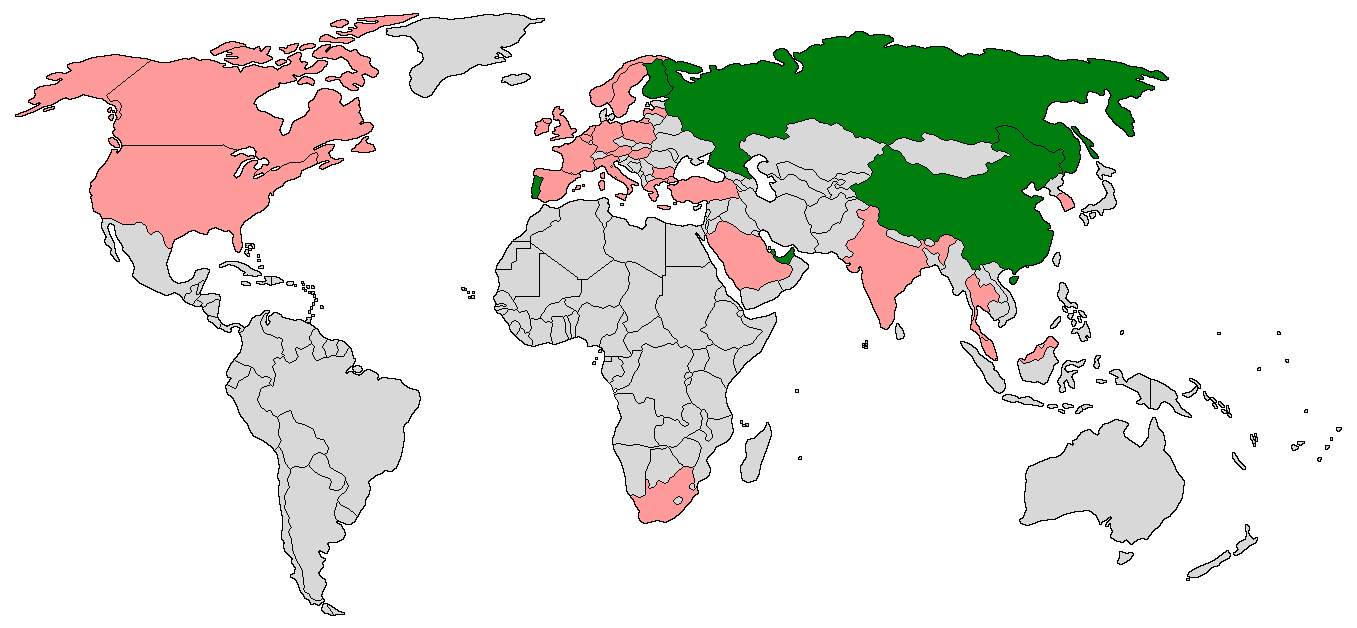
Countries that hosted F1 Powerboat races in 2009, shown in green. Former host nations are shown in pink.

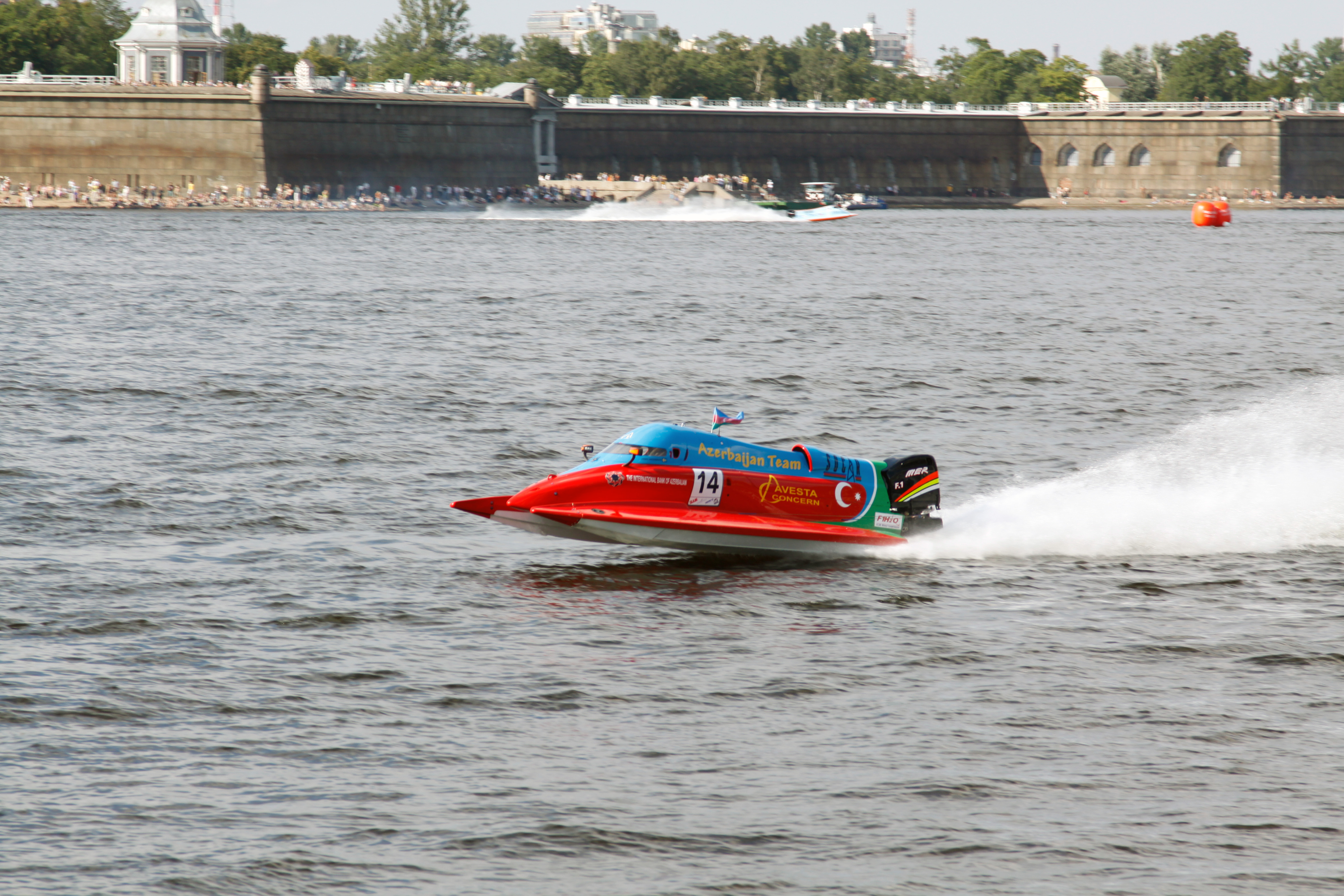
Jonas Andersson at the Grand Prix of Russia in St. Petersburg.

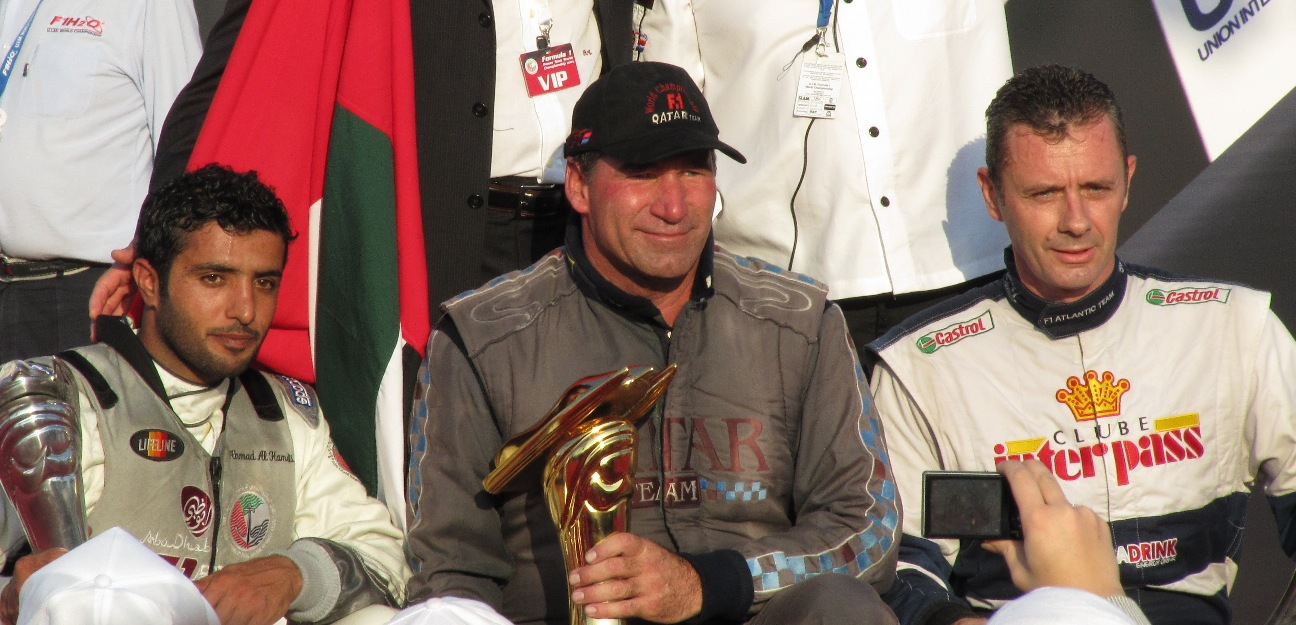
The winners of the Grand Prix of Abu Dhabi second race; left to right: Ahmed Al Hameli, UAE, (second place); Jay Price, USA, (first place); and Philippe Chiappe, France, (third place).

The most significant change for the 2009 season was the introduction of a two-race format for each event making up the championship. With eight rounds confirmed by the UIM prior to the season's start the season would be made up of a total of 16 points-scoring races, the highest in its history. Only the thirteen races in 2000 came close in the previous 10 years. Initial reaction to the new format was positive, with drivers and fans commending the decision following its debut at the Grand Prix of Portugal. However whilst it increased the spectacle and offered teams and drivers more opportunities for success, costs were forced upwards and the format wasn't retained for 2010.

The initial calendar for the 2009 season featured the Grand Prix of Russia in Saint Petersburg as the second round of the championship, taking place on 5 and 6 June. However the race was postponed, with an announcement made on 22 April that it would instead be moved to the second week of August, with the Grand Prix of Finland becoming the second round, on 12 and 13 June.

Round	Race title	Date	Circuit location	Race	Race winner	Hull/Engine
1	11th Grand Prix of Portugal	4–5 April	Portimão	1	(United Arab Emirates) Ahmed Al Hameli	BaBa/Mercury
1	11th Grand Prix of Portugal	4–5 April	Portimão	2	(United Arab Emirates) Thani Al Qamzi	DAC/Mercury
2	5th Grand Prix of Finland	12–13 June	Lahti	1	(Italy) Guido Cappellini	DAC/Mercury
2	5th Grand Prix of Finland	12–13 June	Lahti	2	(United States) Jay Price	DAC/Mercury
3	7th Grand Prix of Russia	8–9 August	Saint Petersburg	1	(United States) Jay Price	DAC/Mercury
3	7th Grand Prix of Russia	8–9 August	Saint Petersburg	2	(Sweden) Jonas Andersson	DAC/Mercury
4	10th Grand Prix of China	6–7 October	Liuzhou	1	(Finland) Sami Seliö	BaBa/Mercury
4	10th Grand Prix of China	6–7 October	Liuzhou	2	(Sweden) Jonas Andersson	DAC/Mercury
5	11th Grand Prix of China	17–18 October	Shenzhen	1	(Italy) Guido Cappellini	DAC/Mercury
5	11th Grand Prix of China	17–18 October	Shenzhen	2	(Finland) Sami Seliö	BaBa/Mercury
6	6th Grand Prix of Qatar	27–28 November	Doha	1	(Italy) Guido Cappellini	DAC/Mercury
6	6th Grand Prix of Qatar	27–28 November	Doha	2	(Italy) Guido Cappellini	DAC/Mercury
7	(United Arab Emirates) 17th Grand Prix of Abu Dhabi	4–5 December	Abu Dhabi	1	(Italy) Guido Cappellini	DAC/Mercury
7	(United Arab Emirates) 17th Grand Prix of Abu Dhabi	4–5 December	Abu Dhabi	2	(United States) Jay Price	DAC/Mercury
8	(United Arab Emirates) 10th Grand Prix of Sharjah	10–11 December	Sharjah	1	(United States) Jay Price	DAC/Mercury
8	(United Arab Emirates) 10th Grand Prix of Sharjah	10–11 December	Sharjah	2	(Finland) Sami Seliö	BaBa/Mercury

== Results and standings ==
Points were awarded to the top 10 classified finishers. A maximum of two boats per team were eligible for points in the teams' championship.

Position	**1st**	**2nd**	**3rd**	**4th**	**5th**	**6th**	**7th**	**8th**	**9th**	**10th**
Points	20	15	12	9	7	5	4	3	2	1

=== Drivers standings ===
Pos	Driver	POR (Portugal)		FIN (Finland)		RUS (Russia)		CHN (China)		CHN (China)		QAT (Qatar)		ABU (United Arab Emirates)		SHA (United Arab Emirates)		Points
Pos	Driver	1	2	1	2	1	2	1	2	1	2	1	2	1	2	1	2	Points
1	(Italy) Guido Cappellini	10	Ret	1	4	Ret	**Ret**	7	2	1	Ret	1	**1**	1	Ret	3	3	153
2	(United Arab Emirates) Thani Al Qamzi	4	1	4	2	Ret	3	Ret	3	7	5	2	4	5	Ret	4	2	143
3	(Finland) Sami Seliö	Ret	Ret	5	3	Ret	2	**1**	**Ret**	**4**	**1**	**Ret**	6	**3**	**Ret**	2	**1**	135
4	(United States) Jay Price	2	**Ret**	Ret	1	**1**	DNS	Ret	Ret	Ret	2	Ret	Ret	2	1	**1**	Ret	125
5	(Sweden) Jonas Andersson	3	9	2	8	Ret	1	5	1	3	10	7	8	6	Ret	6	4	118
6	(Italy) Franceso Cantando	Ret	2	Ret	7	Ret	8	2	Ret	2	8	Ret	2	4	5	Ret	10	87
7	(United Arab Emirates) Ahmed Al Hameli	**1**	Ret	Ret	**6**	2	5	Ret	Ret	6	DNS	Ret	5	8	2	5	DNS	84
8	(France) Philippe Chiappe	Ret	12	11	5	3	7	4	10	Ret	3	4	3	7	3	Ret	DNS	82
9	(Italy) Fabio Comparato	5	Ret	3	Ret	4	4	6	Ret	Ret	7	3	9	9	4	Ret	DNS	71
10	(Sweden) Pierre Lundin	Ret	5	DSQ	Ret	5	DSQ	3	4	5	DNS	6	7	11	Ret	10	7	56
11	(Portugal) Duarte Benavente	Ret	3	6	9	Ret	Ret	8	7	8	6	Ret	10	10	6	DNS	Ret	41
12	(Norway) Marit Strømøy	7	8	9	13	7	10	Ret	5	Ret	DNS	10	11	13	7	7	5	37
13	(Germany) Fabian Kalsow	9	11	13	11	9	11	10	6	9	4	8	12	12	10	DNS	6	30
14	(Latvia) Ugis Gross	6	Ret	7	10	Ret	6	DNS	DNS	DNS	DNS							15
15	(Italy) Valerio Lagiannella	DNS	DNS	8	Ret	6	Ret	9	DNS	11	Ret	DNS	Ret	DNS	8	DNS	DNS	13
16	(Italy) Marco Gambi	Ret	10	14	DNS	10	Ret	11	9	Ret	Ret	9	Ret	14	9	8	Ret	11
17	(United Kingdom) Malcolm Goodman											5	Ret	Ret	Ret	Ret	8	10
18	(Italy) Daniele Martignoni	11	6	12	Ret	8	9											10
19	(United Kingdom) Andy Elliott	Ret	4	DNS	Ret	DNS	DNS											9
20	(Italy) Leo Bonelli	8	7															7
21	(Australia) Craig Bailey							Ret	8	10	9							6
22	(Switzerland) Rinaldo Osculati					Ret	12	Ret	11			11	13	DNS	DNS	9	9	4
23	(Russia) Stanislav Kourtsenovsky			10	12													1
24	(Slovakia) Tomas Cermak											DNS	DNS	Ret	Ret	Ret	Ret	0
25	(Italy) Massimo Roggiero	DNS	DNS	**Ret**	Ret													0

Key
Colour	Result
Gold	Winner
Silver	Second place
Bronze	Third place
Green	Other points position
Blue	Other classified position
Blue	Not classified, finished (NC)
Purple	Not classified, retired (Ret)
Red	Did not qualify (DNQ)
Red	Did not pre-qualify (DNPQ)
Black	Disqualified (DSQ)
White	Did not start (DNS)
White	Race cancelled (C)
Blank	Did not practice (DNP)
Blank	Excluded (EX)
Blank	Did not arrive (DNA)
Blank	Withdrawn (WD)
Blank	Did not enter (cell empty)
Text formatting	Meaning
**Bold**	Pole position
Italics	Fastest lap

=== Teams standings ===
Only boats with results eligible for points counting towards the teams' championship are shown here.

Pos	Team	Boat No.	POR (Portugal)		FIN (Finland)		RUS (Russia)		CHN (China)		CHN (China)		QAT (Qatar)		ABU (United Arab Emirates)		SHA (United Arab Emirates)		Points
Pos	Team	Boat No.	1	2	1	2	1	2	1	2	1	2	1	2	1	2	1	2	Points
1	(United Arab Emirates) Team Abu Dhabi	5	4	1	4	2	Ret	3	Ret	3	7	5	2	4	5	Ret	4	2	227
1	(United Arab Emirates) Team Abu Dhabi	6	**1**	Ret	Ret	**6**	2	5	Ret	Ret	6	DNS	Ret	5	8	2	5	DNS	227
2	(Italy) Zepter Team	74	10	Ret	1	4	Ret	**Ret**	7	2	1	Ret	1	**1**	1	Ret	3	3	168
2	(Italy) Zepter Team	75	6	Ret	7	10	Ret	6	DNS	DNS	DNS	DNS	DNS	DNS	Ret	Ret	Ret	Ret	168
3	Team Azerbaijan	14	3	9	2	8	Ret	1	5	1	3	10	7	8	6	Ret	6	4	155
3	Team Azerbaijan	15	7	8	9	13	7	10	Ret	5	Ret	DNS	10	11	13	7	7	5	155
4	Qatar Team	1	2	**Ret**	Ret	1	**1**	DNS	Ret	Ret	Ret	2	Ret	Ret	2	1	**1**	Ret	148
4	Qatar Team	2	8	7	DNS	Ret	DNS	DNS	Ret	8	10	9	5	Ret	Ret	Ret	Ret	8	148
5	(Finland) Team Mad Croc	11	Ret	Ret	5	3	Ret	2	**1**	**Ret**	**4**	**1**	**Ret**	6	**3**	**Ret**	2	**1**	139
5	(Finland) Team Mad Croc	12	DNS	DNS	**Ret**	Ret	Ret	12	Ret	11			11	13	DNS	DNS	9	9	139
6	(Portugal) F1 Atlantic Team	9	Ret	12	11	5	3	7	4	10	Ret	3	4	3	7	3	Ret	DNS	123
6	(Portugal) F1 Atlantic Team	10	Ret	3	6	9	Ret	Ret	8	7	8	6	Ret	10	10	6	DNS	Ret	123
7	(Italy) Singha F1 Racing Team	23	Ret	10	14	DNS	10	Ret	11	9	Ret	Ret	9	Ret	14	9	8	Ret	98
7	(Italy) Singha F1 Racing Team	24	Ret	2	Ret	7	Ret	8	2	Ret	2	8	Ret	2	4	5	Ret	10	98
8	(France) CTIC China Team	7	Ret	5	DSQ	Ret	5	DSQ	3	4	5	DNS	6	7	11	Ret	10	7	86
8	(France) CTIC China Team	8	9	11	13	11	9	11	10	6	9	4	8	12	12	10	DNS	6	86
9	(Italy) 800 Doctor	69	DNS	DNS	8	Ret	6	Ret	9	DNS	11	Ret	DNS	Ret	DNS	8	DNS	DNS	84
9	(Italy) 800 Doctor	70	5	Ret	3	Ret	4	4	6	Ret	Ret	7	3	9	9	4	Ret	DNS	84
10	(United Kingdom) Ace Racing	50	Ret	4															9
11	(Russia) Prox F1 Racing Team	77			10	12													1

Key
Colour	Result
Gold	Winner
Silver	Second place
Bronze	Third place
Green	Other points position
Blue	Other classified position
Blue	Not classified, finished (NC)
Purple	Not classified, retired (Ret)
Red	Did not qualify (DNQ)
Red	Did not pre-qualify (DNPQ)
Black	Disqualified (DSQ)
White	Did not start (DNS)
White	Race cancelled (C)
Blank	Did not practice (DNP)
Blank	Excluded (EX)
Blank	Did not arrive (DNA)
Blank	Withdrawn (WD)
Blank	Did not enter (cell empty)
Text formatting	Meaning
**Bold**	Pole position
Italics	Fastest lap
