= Khyber Pakhtunkhwa Oil & Gas Company =

Oil and gas company

Khyber Pakhtunkhwa Oil & Gas Company Limited
- Company type: Private
- Industry: Oil and gas
- Founded: 2013; 13 years ago
- Headquarters: Peshawar, Khyber Pakhtunkhwa, Pakistan
- Key people: Nasir Khan (CEO)
- Revenue: ▲ Rs. 86.032 million (US$310,000) (2022)
- Net income: ▼ Rs. 1.155 billion (US$4.1 million) (2022)
- Total assets: ▲ Rs. 2.491 billion (US$8.9 million) (2022)
- Total equity: ▼ Rs. 663.705 million (US$2.4 million) (2022)
- Owner: Government of Khyber Pakhtunkhwa
- Parent: Government of Khyber Pakhtunkhwa
- Website: kpogcl.com.pk
- Footnotes / references Financials as of 30 June 2022

Khyber Pakhtunkhwa Oil & Gas Company Limited commonly known as KPOGCL, is a Pakistani oil and gas exploration company based in Peshawar. It was established by the Government of Khyber Pakhtunkhwa in 2013. KPOGCL is a member of the Pakistan Petroleum Exploration and Production Companies Association. The Acting chief executive officer of the company is Nasir Khan .

The company owns exploration and production rights for about 10 trillion cubic feet (280 billion cubic metres) of natural gas and 600 million barrels (95 million cubic metres) of petroleum resources in Khyber Pakhtunkhwa. In January 2016, the Federal Government of Pakistan allowed KPOGCL for the first time in country's history to sell seepage crude oil. The company may supply up to 23 barrels per day (3.7 m^{3}/d) to Attock Refinery.

In 2015, the company signed a memorandum of understanding with Russian exploration company Rosgeologia on joint exploration and production activities.

In addition to its own activities, the company provides services to other oil and gas companies in seismic data acquisition, geological and geo-physical surveys, logistic support and security arrangement.
