= Khaur =

- Union Council
- Location within Pakistan
- Coordinates: 33°14′28″N 72°16′4″E
- Country: Pakistan
- Province: Punjab
- District: Attock
- Tehsil: Pindigheb
- Region: ghebi
- Time zone: UTC+5 (PST)

Khaur is a town and union council in Pindigheb Tehsil of Attock District in Punjab Province of Pakistan.

== Khaur Oil Field ==
The town is the first site of an oilfield in Punjab which operated from 1911 to the 1950s. The first commercial success came with the drilling of Khaur-1 by Pakistan Oilfields Limited in 1915, on a surface anticline in the Potwar Basin. Oil was discovered in sands in the lower part of the Miocene formation, and a total of 396 shallow wells were drilled in the field from 1915 to 1954.
