= Guido Cappellini =

Italian motorboat racer

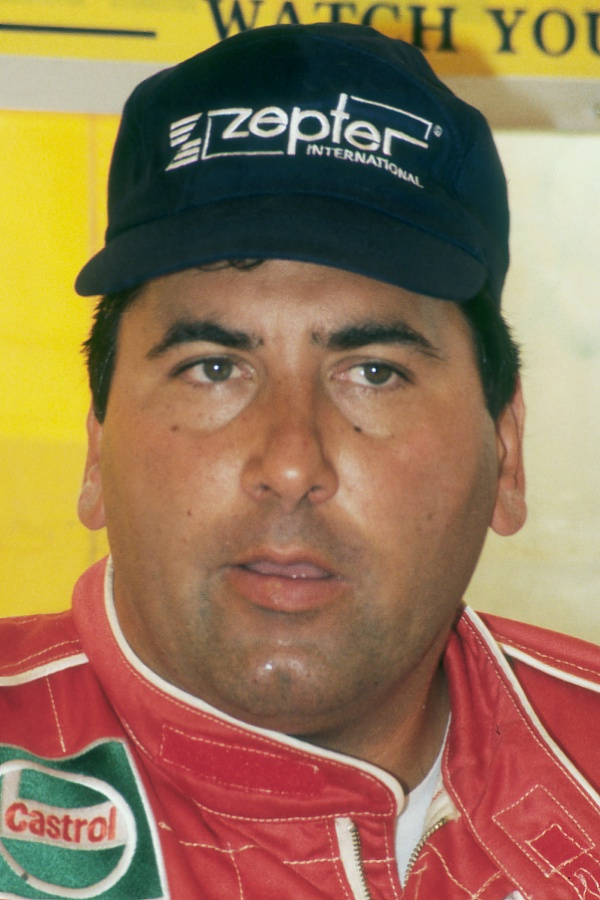
- Nationality: Italian
- Born: 7 September 1959 (age 67) Mariano Comense, Italy
- Retired: 2009

F1 Powerboat World Championship
- Years active: 1990-2009
- Teams: DAC Racing
- Best finish: 1st in 1993-96, 1999, 2001-03, 2005, 2009

Previous series
- 1986-89 1985 1983: FONDA Formula Grand Prix; Formula 3 World Championship; S850 Class

Guido Cappellini (born 7 September 1959 in Mariano Comense) is an Italian motorboat racer and the most successful driver of all time in the F1 Powerboat World Championship, with ten world titles. He has also raced in other classes of boat racing, notably the Class 1 offshore championship, since his retirement from Formula 1 at the end of 2009.

== Career ==
Cappellini began his motorsport career not in a boat, but on four wheels, racing in karts. In 1981 he won the 135cc Italian Championship, and repeated the feat in 1982, alongside victory in the 135cc European Championship as well. During 1982, Cappellini was given the chance to try out a Dallara-Toyota Formula 3 car and took pole position in his first race, showing real promise. However, in 1983 he made the switch to boats, and in the 100 Miglia del Lario that year, he took victory in the S850 class. Cappellini also triumphed in the F3 Inshore category at the Six Hours of Paris in 1983, and in 1985 he finished fifth overall in the F3 Inshore World Championship.

=== FONDA Formula Grand Prix ===
Making his debut in the Formula Grand Prix series in 1986, Cappellini started off driving a Mercury-engined Molinari hull, and during the year enjoyed a best result of two fourth-place finishes in Hanover and Singapore. Whilst Formula 1 disappeared as a world championship and moved entirely to the United States, Cappellini continued to compete at the top level in Europe with DAC Racing, the factory team of the DAC hull manufacturing business. In 1987, a third place in Miami brought Guido his first ever podium and in 1988 he scored three second-place finishes at Augusta, Dublin and Singapore, ultimately finishing the year fourth overall in the final standings. 1989 would bring Cappellini his first race victory in the series, in Italy, at the race in Como.

=== Formula 1 ===
Further victories would follow for the Italian in 1990 at Budapest as the Formula Grand Prix series was renamed the Formula 1 World Championship, and in 1991 at Penang. Guido was narrowly beaten to the title in 1992 with a much-improved boat, as fellow Italian Fabrizio Bocca pipped him to the championship. For Cappellini though, things could only improve. From 1993 to 1996 he took four straight F1 drivers' titles, a record that has yet to be matched. Another title would follow in 1999, before Guido once again asserted his dominance over the sport, winning another three championships in a row from 2001 to 2003. During this time Cappellini's main rival was Scott Gilman, and over the following seasons the two would share in the success, with Gillman winning in 2004, Cappellini taking his ninth title, and 50th career victory, in 2005, and then Gillman winning once again in 2006. From this point Cappellini's form began to decline somewhat within the sport, as other drivers came to the fore, such as Sami Seliö and Jay Price. But, determined to secure an unprecedented tenth world title, Cappellini persisted, and secured it in style with an excellent run of form in the second half of the 2009 season, overcoming Seliö, Price, Thani Al Qamzi and early frontrunner Jonas Andersson. With his milestone secure, Cappellini declared he would be retiring from F1, and turned his focus to other classes on the water.

=== Later life ===
Following his retirement from F1, Cappellini moved to the Class 1 offshore category and became team manager for the DAC Racing team, which runs boat No.74. Beginning in 2010, Guido has enjoyed moderate success within the class, though for 2013 has stepped aside from driving duties, with Tomaso Polli taking over, due to a dispute over technical regulations, with Cappellini stating that when the rules are even for all the teams, he will gladly re-enter the cockpit.

== Racing record ==
=== Complete Formula 1 Powerboat World Championship results ===
Year	Entrant	Hull	Engine	1	2	3	4	5	6	7	8	9	10	11	12	13	14	15	16	WDC	Points
1993	Laserline	DAC	Mercury 2l	THA; 1	ABU; 1^{1}	ITA; 2	FRA; 2	GBR; 3	ITA; 2	HUN; 1	THA; 2	ABU; Ret								1st	133
1994	Laserline	DAC	Mercury 2l	HUN; Ret	ITA; 2	FRA; 2	GBR; 3	ITA; 1	MAL; 3	THA; 2	ABU; 9									1st	108
1995	Laserline-Castrol	DAC	Mercury 2l	ITA; Ret	HUN; 2	GER; 2	FRA; 1	RUS; 1	ITA; 2	CHN; 1	ABU; 9									1st	107
1996	Laserline-Castrol	DAC	Mercury 2l	ITA; 1	HUN; 1	RUS; 1	FRA; 1	GRE; 1	CHN; 1	ITA; 13	ITA; 1	ABU; 1								1st	160
1997	DAC Racing	DAC	Mercury 2l	HUN; 2	RUS; DSQ	FRA; 2	GRE; Ret	ITA; 2	RUS; 1	ITA; 1	CHN; 3	ABU; 13								3rd	97
1998	Laserline Racing	DAC	Mercury 2l	ITA; 1	RUS; Ret	FRA; 1	FIN; Ret	GRE; 1	ITA; Ret	HUN; 4	RUS; 3	ABU; Ret								2nd	81
1999	Laserline Racing	DAC	Mercury 2l	POR; 1	ITA; 1	RUS; C^{2}	FRA; 1	HUN; 1	RUS; 2	TUR; 2^{3}	AUT; 1^{4}	ABU; 1								1st	130
2000	Laserline Castrol Racing	DAC	Mercury 2.5l	POR; 1	BEL; 1	HUN; 1	LAT; Ret	FRA; 1	ITA; Ret	POL; DNS	BUL; DNS^{5}	TUR; 1	ITA; 1	AUT	SHA	ABU; 2				3rd	135
2001	Assicom Team	DAC	Mercury 2.5l	MAL; Ret	POR; 1	HUN; 1	LAT; 1	ITA; 1	ITA; Ret	GER; 3	AUT; DSQ	SHA; 1	ABU; 5							1st	119
2002	Zepter Team	DAC	Mercury 2.5l	POR; 1	ITA; 1	FIN; Ret	HUN; 1	ITA; 1	GER; 1	MAL; 2	IRE; 2	SHA; DSQ	ABU; Ret							1st	130
2003	Zepter Team	DAC	Mercury 2.5l	POR; 1	FIN; 2	ITA; 1	GER; Ret	MAL; 2	SIN; 2	SHA; Ret	ABU; 3									1st	97
2004	Tamoil F1 Team	DAC	Mercury 2.5l	IND; 2	KSA; 4	POR; 4	ITA; Ret	ITA; 1	CHN; 2	SIN; Ret	MAL; Ret	KOR; 2^{6}	SHA; Ret							4th	68
2005	Tamoil F1 Team	DAC	Mercury 2.5l	POR; 1	ITA; 1	SIN; Ret	QAT; 1	ABU; 3	SHA; 1											1st	92
2006	Tamoil F1 Team	DAC	Mercury 2.5l	QAT; Ret	POR; 1	ITA; 1	CHN; 6	ABU; 1	SHA; Ret											2nd	65
2007	Tamoil F1 Team	DAC	Mercury 2.5l	POR; 2	FRA; Ret	CHN; 2	CHN; 1	QAT; 2	QAT; 1	ABU; 2	SHA; Ret									2nd	100
2008	Tamoil F1 Team	DAC	Mercury 2.5l	QAT; 5	POR; Ret	FIN; 1	RUS; Ret	CHN; Ret	CHN	ABU; Ret	SHA; Ret									10th	27
2009	Zepter Team	DAC	Mercury 2.5l	POR; 1; 10	POR; 2 Ret	FIN; 1; 1	FIN; 2; 4	RUS; 1 Ret	RUS; 2 Ret	CHN; 1; 7	CHN; 2; 2	CHN; 1; 1	CHN; 2 Ret	QAT; 1; 1	QAT; 2; 1	ABU; 1; 1	ABU; 2 Ret	SHA; 1; 3	SHA; 2; 3	1st	153

- ^1 The first 1993 Grand Prix of Abu Dhabi was halted after less than half distance following two separate crashes, one of which claimed the life of John Hill. Half points were awarded.
- ^2 The 1999 Grand Prix of Russia was halted after 12 laps with results annulled and no points awarded.
- ^3 The starting grid for the 1999 Grand Prix of Turkey was formed on the basis of current championship standings following the İzmit earthquake, with the race held as planned on Sunday 22 August.
- ^4 The 1999 Grand Prix of Austria was stopped after seven laps, with the results taken from the completion of the seventh lap, and no points awarded.
- ^5 The 2000 Grand Prix of Bulgaria was declared null and void following drivers' protests after the qualifying session that the course was too narrow and the water too shallow to be safe enough to race on. The race was declared an exhibition race and those drivers who hadn't lodged protests agreed to take part, with no World Championship points awarded.
- ^6 The 2004 Grand Prix of Korea was run under the 'match race' format, and the event thus did not count towards the final championship standings and no points were awarded.

=== Career summary ===
Season	Win	Pod	Pole	Plcd
1993				1st
1994				1st
1995				1st
1996				1st
1997				3rd
1998				2nd
1999				1st
2000				3rd
2001				1st
2002	5	4	7	1st
2003	2	6	6	1st
2004	1	3	3	1st
2005	4	3	5	1st
2006	3	3	3	2nd
2007	2			2nd
2008	1			10th
2009	5			1st

=== Class 1 results ===
Year	Competition	Venue	Position	Event	Notes
2010	Offshore powerboat racing	(Italy) Stresa	2nd	Race 1	
2010	Offshore powerboat racing	(Italy) Stresa	2nd	Race 2	
2010	Offshore powerboat racing	(Brazil) Rio de Janeiro	3rd	Race 2	
2010	Offshore powerboat racing	(Sweden) Uddevalla	3rd	Race 1	
2010	Offshore powerboat racing	(United Arab Emirates) Dubai	3rd	Race 2	
2011	Offshore powerboat racing	(Italy) Cernobbio	2nd	Race 2	

== See also ==
- Most successful athlete in each sport at the World Championships
