= Reem Osman =

Saudi Arabian healthcare executive

Dr.Reem Osman is a Saudi Arabian healthcare executive of Syrian origin. She serves as Vice Chairwoman of the Saudi German Health in the United Arab Emirates and the founder of Reem Holding, a UAE-based investment and development company.

== Early life and education ==
Reem Osman was born and raised in Syria. She graduated from Tishreen University with a medical degree and later obtained a master's degree in ophthalmology and eye surgery from the same institution. In 2010, she enrolled in a two-year Master of Business Administration program which she completed in 2012.

== Career ==
Dr. Reem practiced as an ophthalmologist for four years before pursuing business studies. She began her career as a doctor at the Saudi German Hospital Group. Following her MBA graduation in 2012, she rejoined the organization as a member of its finance team and was soon promoted to chief executive officer of the Saudi German Hospital in Dubai. In this role, she oversaw the expansion of the hospital's staff from 400 to 2,000 employees.

In November 2017, Dr. Reem was appointed chief executive officer of the Saudi German Hospital Group UAE, overseeing operations across facilities in Dubai, Sharjah, Ajman, and Ras Al Khaimah. She holds a certificate in healthcare delivery management from Harvard Business School.

=== Awards and recognition ===
In 2014, Dr. Reem Osman was named in the Forbes Middle East list of the 200 Most Powerful Arab Women. In 2017, Arabian Business included her among the 15 most influential people in the UAE. She has been regularly recognized among the most influential women in the Arab world by CEO Middle East. In 2024, she was named to Arabian Business magazine's list of 50 Inspiring Women Leaders in the UAE.

== Personal life ==
Reem Osman is married to Sobhi Batterjee, chairman of Saudi German Health. They have three children.
