= Issa Al-Ghaith =

Issa Abdullah bin Abdulrahman Al-Ghaith
- عيسى الغيث
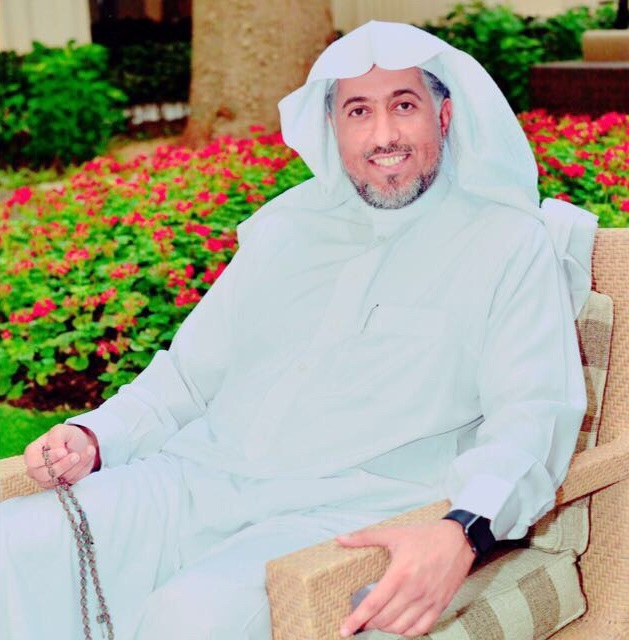

Member of the Consultative Assembly of Saudi Arabia

Personal details
- Born: 10 August 1972 (age 54) Riyadh, Saudi Arabia
- Education: Al-Azhar University (Sharia and Law College )

Issa Abdullah bin Abdulrahman Al-Ghaith is a judge, Islamic scholar, author, and activist. He served as a member of the Consultative Assembly of Saudi Arabia and on the board of trustees of the King Abdulaziz Center for National Dialogue. He received a doctor's degree in Sharia and Law College in Al-Azhar University in Cairo, Egypt.

After that, he worked as a lecturer and assistant professor in Imam Muhammad ibn Saud Islamic University, College of Shariah, Jurisprudence Department until he was assigned as Member of the Consultative Assembly of Saudi Arabia.

== Views ==
Madawi Al-Rasheed describes Al-Ghaith as a judge in Riyadh who condemned those who issue strict opinions on ikhtilat (gender mixing).

He supported the normalization of ties with Israel in August 2020 (before the signing of the Abraham Accords), saying "It is time to look after our interests and resist our enemies who occupied our lands under the pretext of liberating Al-Aqsa ... We look forward to a fair normalization [with Israel] that achieves the interests of the country [Saudi Arabia] and its people".

== Professional experience ==
- Member, Consultative Assembly of Saudi Arabia.
- Member, Board of Trustees, King Abdulaziz Center for National Dialogue
- Vice chairman, Board of Grievances.
- Assistant Deputy, an Appellate Judge level, Board of Grievances.
- Member, Audit panel, Board of Grievances.
- Advisor, Court (A) deputy level, Board of Grievances.
- Court Council member, Discipline panel.
