= Laith Pharaon =

Saudi powerboat racer and entrepreneur

Laith Gaith Pharaon (Arabic: ليث فرعون) is a Saudi Arabian businessman and real estate property developer. Earlier in his career, he competed on the offshore and F1 powerboat racing circuit for several years.

== Life and career ==
Laith Pharaon was born on September 8, 1968, in London, UK to Ghaith Pharaon and Hala Pharaon.

=== Entrepreneurship ===
Pharaon is founder and chief executive officer of Orca Holding, an international investment holding company based in Valletta (Malta), with affiliated companies in several countries. He is a member of the board of directors of National Refinery Limited and Attock Refinery Limited.

=== Racing titles and achievements ===
From 1995 to 2006, Laith Pharaon competed internationally in offshore Motonautics races Class 1. He was inducted into the American Power Boat Association (APBA) Hall of Champions in 1996. He won 4 races of the World Championship F1; a Championship of the USA (1996); European and World Titles (1997); Pole Position World Title (1998).

==== American Power Boat Association APBA - Offshore Category ====
- 1996 - 1st place

==== Union Internationale Motonautique (UIM) - World Class I - 16 litre - Offshore Championship ====
- 1997 - 1st place
- 1998 - 4th place
- 1999 - Retired

==== Union Internationale Motonautique (UIM) - World F1 Championship ====
- 2000 - 17th
- 2001 - 5th
- 2002 - 2nd
- 2003 - 4th
- 2004 - 9th
- 2005 - 7th
- 2006 - 23rd
