= Attock Petroleum Limited =

Pakistani oil marketing company

- Native name: اٹک پیٹرولیم محدود
- Type: Public
- Traded as: PSX: APL; KSE 100 component
- Industry: Petroleum
- Founded: 1995; 31 years ago
- Founder: Ghaith Pharaon
- Headquarters: Rawalpindi, Pakistan
- Products: Lubricants, LPG, CNG
- Revenue: ▼ Rs. 482.429 billion (US$1.7 billion) (2025)
- Operating income: ▼ Rs. 12.484 billion (US$45 million) (2025)
- Net income: ▼ Rs. 10.392 billion (US$37 million) (2025)
- Total assets: ▲ Rs. 122.302 billion (US$440 million) (2025)
- Total equity: ▲ Rs. 62.628 billion (US$220 million) (2025)
- Owner: Pharaon Investment Group Limited (34.38%); Attock Refinery Limited (21.88%); Attock Petroleum Limited Employees Welfare Trust (7.04%); Pakistan Oilfields Limited (7.02%)
- Number of employees: 469 (2025)
- Parent: Attock Group
- Website: apl.com.pk
- Footnotes; Financials as of 30 June 2025

Attock Petroleum Limited (Urdu pronunciation: [a.ˈʈʌk pə.ˈtroʊ.li.əm] ah-TUCK) is a Pakistani oil marketing company headquartered in Rawalpindi. It is part of Attock Group.

== History ==
Attock Petroleum Limited was incorporated on 3 December 1995 as a private limited company. It began commercial operations in 1998 as one of only four new oil marketing companies licensed by the Oil and Gas Regulatory Authority to operate in the country.

In 2005, Attock was listed on the Karachi Stock Exchange, following an initial public offering at a strike price of PKR 57.75.

In 2012, Attock began regular supply of JP-8 and ground fuel to the Pakistan Air Force and Pakistan Army.

In 2017, Attock and Pakistan State Oil commissioned a 10,000-tonne hydrant-fed "Fuel Farm" at the New Islamabad International Airport, the first aircraft refuelling system in Pakistan.

== Operations ==
Attock operates more than 700 filling stations from Gilgit-Baltistan in the north to coastal Balochistan in the south. It also provides CNG at selected stations. Previously, it also operated two filling stations in Jalalabad and exported white oils and naphtha under the Afghan Transit Trade Agreement.

== Products ==
Attock markets its mainstream petrol under the Premier and Supreme labels and diesel under DieselMax.

== See also ==
- Attock Refinery
