= Pakistan Oilfields Limited =

Pakistani oil and gas exploration company

- Formerly: Pakistan Oil and Gas Exploration and Production Company
- Type: Public
- Traded as: PSX: POL; KSE 100 component KSE 30 component
- Industry: Petroleum
- Founded: 1950; 76 years ago at Attock, Pakistan
- Headquarters: POL House, Morgah, Rawalpindi, Pakistan
- Area served: Pakistan
- Key people: Shuaib A. Malik (Chairman and CEO)
- Products: Crude oil Natural gas Liquefied petroleum gas Sulphur
- Revenue: ▼ Rs. 62.370 billion (US$220 million) (2025)
- Operating income: ▼ Rs. 36.025 billion (US$130 million) (2025)
- Net income: ▼ Rs. 24.181 billion (US$86 million) (2025)
- Total assets: ▲ Rs. 177.003 billion (US$630 million) (2025)
- Total equity: ▼ Rs. 80.094 billion (US$290 million) (2025)
- Owner: Attock Oil Company (52.77%)
- Number of employees: 663 (2025)
- Parent: Attock Oil Company
- Subsidiaries: CAPGAS (Private) Limited; National Refinery Limited (25%)
- Website: pakoil.com.pk
- Footnotes; Financials as of 30 June 2025

The Pakistan Oilfields Limited is a Pakistani oil and gas exploration company based in Rawalpindi, Punjab Province, Pakistan. It is a subsidiary of UK-domiciled Attock Oil Company.

Until 1978, Pakistan Oilfields also ran its oil refinery, but after an agreement with the government, it was separated into Attock Refinery Limited.

== History ==
=== 1950–1977: Under the British ownership ===
Pakistan Oilfields was set up by the Attock Oil Company, which had been registered in London in 1913 and ran four oilfields in Punjab, among them Dhulian, which was discovered in 1937. After the partition of India, Pakistan's oil rules of 1949 allowed only Pakistani nationals and companies incorporated in Pakistan to apply for new oil development licences. In response, Attock Oil and the Burmah Oil Company each formed a Pakistani company in 1950, Pakistan Oilfields and Pakistan Petroleum respectively. Pakistan Oilfields was incorporated on November 25, 1950, and registered in Lahore. Its share capital was set at 10 million rupees, of which Attock Oil was to take 70 percent, while the remaining 30 percent would be offered to Pakistani nationals. Attock Oil continued to operate its established fields under the earlier regulations, and exploration in other areas became the job of the new subsidiary. In 1952 and 1953, the company drilled exploratory wells at Bains and Dhariala. In 1953, the government chose to become a 30 percent shareholder in Pakistan Oilfields and in Pakistan Petroleum.

Karsal, north-west of the Balkassar field, got its first well in 1956, when Pakistan Oilfields drilled to 12,751 feet (3,887 m), but testing showed a potential of only 10 to 20 barrels of oil a day. In 1957, Pakistan Oilfields reached a joint operating agreement with Pakistan Petroleum covering their neighbouring concessions. The third Karsal well, in Pakistan Petroleum's concession area, was declared a commercial producer in October 1959, making Karsal the first oilfield proven in Pakistan since independence. In 1968, Pakistan Oilfields struck oil at Meyal at a depth of 12,405 feet (3,781 m). Meyal led the country's oil production in 1977, averaging almost 6,800 barrels a day, and that year the company sold 165 million cubic metres of the field's associated gas. Later, Pakistan Oilfields hired an Italian company, under a US$7.8 million contract, to build a 284-tonne-a-day plant at Meyal that would produce liquefied petroleum gas (LPG) from the field's associated gas.

=== 1977–present: Under the Saudi ownership ===
The Kuwait International Finance Company (KIFCO) formed Finance and Investment International (FIIL) to hold a stake in Attock Oil, and in 1977 FIIL bought 51 percent of Attock Oil from its parent company, Attock Petroleum, which was later renamed Anvil Petroleum. Attock Petroleum later sold its remaining shares, leaving Attock Oil wholly owned by FIIL. KIFCO's owners included Ghaith Pharaon and Kamal Adham. By November 1978, Attock Oil and the government had settled on a deal separating Attock's operations into two companies. Pakistan Oilfields took over Attock's exploration and production business and remained 60 percent owned by Attock, 34 percent by the government and 6 percent by the public, while Attock's refinery was moved to a new company, Attock Refinery Limited. Pharaon, a Saudi businessman, also held shares in the Bank of Credit and Commerce International (BCCI). After the bank was closed in 1991, a 1992 report to the United States Senate Committee on Foreign Relations named Attock Oil among the BCCI-related institutions in which Pharaon had held interests as a nominee for the bank. In 1997, a Cayman Islands court awarded the bank's liquidators US$2.1 billion in damages from Pharaon. It found that he had joined a conspiracy to keep hidden the fact that International Credit and Investment Company, a firm closely tied to BCCI, owned oil interests held by Attock Oil. Pharaon said he would appeal.

In 1991, Occidental Petroleum discovered oil and gas at Pindori in the Soan block, in which Pakistan Oilfields held 7 percent. Pakistan Oilfields later became the operator of the Pindori field, with a 35 percent interest, and by 2003 Pindori supplied about 42 percent of the oil the company produced. In 1995, POL made an oil and gas discovery at Pariwali, in the Potwar region. In 2000, the Privatisation Commission engaged advisers on selling the government's holdings in nine oil and gas licences, including Minwal, Pariwali and Turkwal, which Pakistan Oilfields operated. In October 2002, the government sold 28.5 million shares of Pakistan Oilfields for Rs 5.1 billion at Rs 180 per share. Until 2003, it was the only oil and gas exploration company with shares quoted on Pakistan's stock exchanges.

Pakistan Oilfields also held 25 percent of the Tal block in the North-West Frontier Province (now Khyber Pakhtunkhwa), which is operated by the Hungarian company MOL and where a gas and condensate discovery was made in early 2003. By 2011, Tal was one of the four fields that supplied most of the company's oil. In 2005, a consortium of Attock group companies that included Pakistan Oilfields bought 51 percent of National Refinery from the government for Rs 16.4 billion. In October 2017, Prime Minister Shahid Khaqan Abbasi inaugurated the Jhandial-1 well in the company's Ikhlas block in Attock District, its first major discovery in five years. Pakistan Oilfields held 80 percent of the block and Attock Oil the other 20 percent. When MOL found gas and condensate at Mamikhel South in the Tal block in 2020, Pakistan Oilfields held 21 percent of the block, with a 25 percent working interest before commerciality. Another discovery in the block, Razgir-1, followed in 2024. The Tal block was originally developed under Pakistan's 1997 petroleum policy. In 2015, they signed a supplemental agreement converting it to the 2012 policy's terms, but the agreement left out the windfall levy on oil. Pakistan Oilfields and the other partners went to the Islamabad High Court in 2018 to contest a government notification on the levy. In 2023, the energy minister of Khyber Pakhtunkhwa said the omission had cost the province Rs 45 billion between 2012 and 2021.

Pakistan Oilfields, which holds 25 percent of the Razgir discovery, objected when MOL agreed to sell the field's gas to Universal Gas Distribution Company without competitive bidding. The company said it had not been told about the negotiations and asked for the gas to be sold through a competitive process. In February 2026, Pakistan Oilfields was awarded the Jherruk exploration block with a 100 percent working interest.

== Operations ==
Pakistan Oilfields has its head office at POL House in Morgah, Rawalpindi. It wholly owns the Balkassar, Joya Mair and Khaur leases and holds majority interests in the Pariwali and Turkwal leases, all of which it operates. It is also the operator of the Pindori field and of the Ikhlas and DG Khan exploration blocks. Its interests in fields run by other companies include the MOL-operated Tal block and 11 percent of the Adhi field, which Pakistan Petroleum operates. As of 2020, POL operated 12 oilfields and 8 gas fields in Punjab.

Besides crude oil and natural gas, Pakistan Oilfields produces LPG, sulphur and solvent oil. It sells LPG under the POLGAS brand and through CAPGAS, a subsidiary in which it holds 51 percent. The company owns 25 percent of National Refinery Limited and 7 percent of Attock Petroleum Limited.

== See also ==
- Attock Group of Companies
