= Falcon Cement =

Attock Cement
- Type: Public
- Traded as: PSX: ACPL
- Industry: Cement
- Founded: 1981; 45 years ago
- Founder: Ghaith Pharaon
- Headquarters: Karachi, Pakistan
- Key people: Laith Pharaon (chairman); Babar Bashir Nawaz (CEO)
- Products: OPC Ordinary Portland Cement; SRC Suplhate Resistant Cement; FBC Falcon Block Cement
- Revenue: ▲ Rs. 28.536 billion (US$100 million) (2024)
- Operating income: ▼ Rs. 1.984 billion (US$7.1 million) (2024)
- Net income: ▲ Rs. 3.566 billion (US$13 million) (2024)
- Total assets: ▲ Rs. 53.174 billion (US$190 million) (2024)
- Total equity: ▲ Rs. 21.516 billion (US$77 million) (2024)
- Owner: Pharaon Investment Group Limited (84.06%)
- Number of employees: 922 (2024)
- Parent: Pharaon Investment Group Limited Holding S.A.L.
- Website: attockcement.com
- Footnotes; Financials as of 30 June 2024

Attock Cement Pakistan Limited (Urdu pronunciation: [a.ˈʈʌk sɪˈmɛnt] ah-TUCK-si-MENT), trading as Falcon Cement, is a Pakistani cement manufacturer headquartered in Karachi, with manufacturing plant in Hub, Balochistan. It was incorporated in Pakistan on 14 October 1981 as a public limited company. It is a subsidiary of Pharaon Investment Group Limited Holding S.A.L, Lebanon.

Atock Cement is listed on the Pakistan Stock Exchange.

== History ==
Attock Cement was established in 1981 and commercial production starting in 1988 with a capacity of 0.6 million tons per annum.

In 2002, Attock Cement was listed on the Karachi Stock Exchange.

Attock Cement went through a series of expansions, and now the company has a production capacity of 3 million tons annually as of 2018.

== Former subsidiary ==
ACPL also made investment in a cement grinding unit in Iraq through a joint venture with the Iraq-based Al Keetan Commercial Agencies to form a subsidiary. ACPL holds 60 percent of the company. The mill has a capacity of 0.9 million tons. In May 2023 the Attock Cement Company announced its intention to sell its Iraq operations to Iraqi interests.

== Products ==
Attock Cement Pakistan Limited is principally engaged in manufacturing and sale of cement. The company is also engaged in exporting clinker and cement both in bags and bulk to the United Arab Emirates (UAE), Africa, Iraq, Sri Lanka and many other countries. The company also has the facility of supply of cement in bulk and also produces the low alkali cement for some regions of its market.

- Falcon brand cement used in general construction
- Sulfate resistant cement used in seaport and coastal areas because it provides resistance to chemical attack from sulfates and dissolved salts present in sea water

Its products include Ordinary Portland Cement (OPC), which is a product under the Falcon Brand used in all types of general construction. OPC can be used in concretes, mortars, grouts and premix concrete.

The company's Falcon Block Cement (FBC) product is offered for block and precast slab makers.
