= Hydroskimming =

Hydroskimming is one of the simplest types of refinery used in the petroleum industry and still represents a large proportion of refining facilities, particularly in developing countries. A hydroskimming refinery is defined as a refinery equipped with atmospheric distillation, naphtha reforming and necessary treating processes. A hydroskimming refinery is therefore more complex than a topping refinery (which just separates the crude into its constituent petroleum products by distillation, known as atmospheric distillation, and produces naphtha but no gasoline) and it produces gasoline. The addition of catalytic reformer enables a hydroskimming refinery to generate higher octane reformate; benzene, toluene, and xylene; and hydrogen for hydrotreating units. However, a hydroskimming refinery produces a surplus of fuel oil with a relatively unattractive price and demand.

Most refineries, therefore, add vacuum distillation and catalytic cracking, which adds one more level of complexity by reducing fuel oil by conversion to light distillates and middle distillates. A coking refinery adds further complexity to the cracking refinery by high conversion of fuel oil into distillates and petroleum coke.

Catalytic cracking, coking and other such conversion units are referred to as secondary processing units. The Nelson Complexity Index, captures the proportion of the secondary conversion unit capacities relative to the primary distillation or topping capacity. The Nelson Complexity Index typically varies from about 2 for hydroskimming refineries, to about 5 for the Cracking refineries and over 9 for the Coking refineries.
