= Asphalt =

Asphalt most often refers to:

- Bitumen, also known as "liquid asphalt cement" or simply "asphalt", a viscous form of petroleum mainly used as a binder in asphalt concrete
- Asphalt concrete, a mixture of bitumen with coarse and fine aggregates, used as a road surface
- Tarmac, the road-surfacing material informally known as "asphalt"

Asphalt may also refer to:

- Asphalt (1929 film), a German silent film by Joe May
- Asphalt (1964 film), a South Korean film by Kim Ki-young
- Asphalt (novel), an American novel by Carl Hancock Rux
- Asphalt (series), a racing game series produced by Gameloft
- Asphalt, Kentucky
- USS Asphalt (IX-153), a Trefoil-class concrete barge
- Asphalt modified racing, a variant of modified stock car racing using cars designed for asphalt surfaces
- "Asphalt", a song by Hot Country Knights from The K Is Silent

== See also ==
- Asphaltum, Indiana
- Shilajit or black asphaltum, an organic-based clay
