= Ghaith Pharaon =

Saudi Arabian businessperson (1940-2017)

- Born: Ghaith Rashad Pharaon; September 7, 1940
- Died: January 6, 2017 (aged 76); Beirut
- Occupation: Businessman

Ghaith Rashad Pharaon (Arabic: غيث فرعون; September 7, 1940 – January 6, 2017) was a Saudi fugitive financier and businessman who was founder of Attock Group, Attock Cement, and at one time an investor in the Bank of Credit and Commerce International (BCCI), an international bank established by Pakistani financier Agha Hasan Abedi. He was described by Forbes magazine as once near a billionaire.

Secretly acting on behalf of BCCI, Pharaon acquired control of two American banks in violation of federal banking laws. When the fraud was discovered, BCCI was forced to sell the banks, and soon after shut down by regulators when it was determined to be insolvent. Pharaon was charged with wire fraud and racketeering conspiracy; although he eventually paid out substantial fines and a major settlement to the bank's liquidators, the criminal charges were never resolved and American authorities were seeking his extradition until he died in 2017.

== Early life and education ==
Ghaith Pharaon is the son of Rashad Pharaon who served as Saudi Ambassador to all Europe from 1948 until 1954. His father was also advisor to King Faisal. He attended schools in Lebanon, Syria and Switzerland. His university education was in the United States at the Colorado School of Mines from 1959 to 1961 followed by Stanford University from 1962 to 1963; and Harvard Business School from 1963 to 1965 (until his graduation). He was appointed as a member of the board of associates of Harvard Business School and as a member of the International Development Council of the Colorado School of Mines. After graduating from Harvard, Pharaon formed the Saudi Research And Development Corporation, Ltd. (REDEC), the largest private enterprise in the Middle East.

Pharaon was a key player in the global oil and banking industries in the 1970s and 1980s and at one time, the No. 2 Saudi investor in the United States. In 1977, he acquired the National Bank of Georgia from owner Bert Lance as part of complex scheme to take over a large Washington D.C. bank, First American Bankshares, on behalf of BCCI. This eventually led to criminal charges against him in the United States. He died on January 6, 2017, at the age of 76.

== Business ==
Pharaon served as Chair of Attock Petroleum. He also served as the Chairman of National Refinery and Attock Cement Pakistan Ltd. He served as the Chairman of Attock Refinery Ltd. until February 18, 2011. He served as a Director of Pakistan Oilfields, the Attock Refinery Ltd., Attock Cement Pakistan Ltd and the National Refinery Ltd.

== Military contracts ==
Although Pharaon had been a wanted fugitive by the F.B.I since 1991 for massive fraud in the financial collapse of BCCI Bank; Pharaon was awarded a total of $120 million in contracts by the United States military in 2008. The contracts were to supply thousands of tons of jet fuel to American bases stationed in Afghanistan and were awarded to Attock Refinery, a Pakistan-based refinery owned by him and directed by Kamal Adham, the former head of Saudi Intelligence.

== Personal life ==
Pharaon used to spend up to six months a year in Pakistan, where he operated his businesses and commercial interests. The extremely wealthy Pharaon was known to have been quite fond of cigars. He lived in his super yacht, which he named Le Pharaon after himself and this repeatedly was seen moored alongside luxury yachts of the rich and famous. In June 2005, it was seen moored next to the personal yacht of Saudi King Abdullah in a Greek port. Two years earlier, it was seen parked next to another Saudi royal family super yacht near Beirut.

In 2016 it was reported that he bought a house in Budapest, right next to the personal residence of the Hungarian Prime minister Viktor Orbán.
