= Attock Oil Company =

Oil company in the UK

The Attock Oil Company Limited
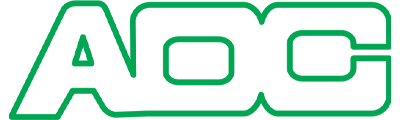
- Type: Holding
- Industry: Petroleum
- Founded: 1913; 113 years ago
- Founder: Francis J. Mitchell
- Headquarters: Manchester, England, United Kingdom
- Key people: Laith G. Pharaon (Chairman) Shuaib A. Malik (CEO)
- Revenue: ▲US$ 4.11 billion (2012–2013)
- Number of employees: Over 10,000
- Subsidiaries: Attock Cement; Attock Petroleum Limited; Attock Refinery Limited; National Refinery Limited; Pakistan Oilfields Limited
- Website: the-aoc.com

Attock Oil Company, informally called Attock Group, also known as the Pharaon Group, is a UK-domiciled conglomerate company based in Manchester, England, United Kingdom. It is the sole vertically integrated oil conglomerate company active in Pakistani market.

The group is owned by the Pharaon family.

== History ==
Attock Oil Company Limited (AOC) was incorporated in England on 1 December 1913 by Francis J. Mitchell, and extended into Pakistan as a branch office of a foreign company for the principal business of exploration, drilling and production of petroleum products.

AOC met its first oil discovery in 1915 at Khaur, Attock District. Thereafter, AOC made significant contributions in promoting oil and gas exploration in the country by opening up the Potohar Basin as a new oil province. The Potohar Basin remained the only oil producing basin in Pakistan till the early 1970s.

Although the company was established by British entrepreneurs, control was purchased by Saudi investor Ghaith Pharaon in the 1970s. Pharaon's family still own the company.

In 2004, Attock invested US$400 million in Pakistan. It included: petroleum pipeline from Machike, Lahore to Taru Jabba, Peshawar, and a 150 MW power plant in Rawalpindi District.

== Subsidiaries ==
The Attock Oil Company consists of the following companies:

=== Listed ===
- Pakistan Oilfields Limited
- Attock Refinery Limited
- National Refinery Limited
- Attock Petroleum Limited
- Attock Cement

=== Unlisted ===
- Attock Gen. Limited (power plant)
- Attock Hospital (Pvt.) Limited (AHL)
