= Attock Refinery Limited =

Oil refinery in Pakistan

- Native name: پالایشگاه اٹک محدود
- Type: Public
- Traded as: PSX: ATRL; KSE 100 component KSE 30 component
- Industry: Oil refining
- Founded: 1922; 104 years ago
- Headquarters: Rawalpindi, Punjab, Pakistan
- Area served: Pakistan
- Key people: Adil Khattak (CEO); Laith G. Pharaon (Chairman)
- Revenue: ▼ Rs. 301.329 billion (US$1.1 billion) (2025)
- Operating income: ▼ Rs. 19.050 billion (US$68 million) (2025)
- Net income: ▼ Rs. 11.972 billion (US$43 million) (2025)
- Total assets: ▲ Rs. 67.115 billion (US$240 million) (2025)
- Total equity: ▲ Rs. 143.667 billion (US$510 million) (2025)
- Owner: Attock Oil Company (61.06%)
- Number of employees: 847 (2025)
- Parent: Attock Oil Company
- Subsidiaries: Attock Gen Limited (30%); National Refinery Limited (25%); Attock Petroleum Limited (21.88%); Attock IT Services Limited (10%)
- Website: arl.com.pk
- Footnotes; Financials as of 30 June 2025

Attock Refinery Limited (Urdu pronunciation: [a.ˈʈʌk rɪˈfaɪn.ər.i] ah-TUCK) is a Pakistani oil refinery headquartered in Rawalpindi. It is a subsidiary of UK-domiciled Attock Oil Company. It is the oldest oil refinery of Pakistan.

It is listed on Pakistan Stock Exchange.

== History ==
=== 1922–1978: Early years and operations under Attock Oil Company ===
Attock Refinery's history dates back to the early 20th century when British companies became interested in oil exploration in the Attock District of Punjab, then part of British India. In December 1913, a group of British investors established the Attock Oil Company with an initial investment of £25,000.

In January 1915, Attock Oil commenced drilling operations which led to the discovery of oil at shallow depths. Progress was interrupted by World War I; however, following the war, the company began constructing an oil refinery at Morgah, which was connected to the oilfields through a pipeline. The refinery commenced operations in March 1922 with an initial capacity of 2,500 barrels per day. Its oil reserves were depleted faster than expected which led to operational challenges. In 1937, with support of the government it made another new discovery of oil reserves in Attock region, which led to the expansion of refinery.

=== 1978–present: Attock Refinery Limited ===
In November 1978, the Attock Oil Company was reorganized following an agreement with the Government of Pakistan. The reorganization included a revision of its capital structure, which led to the incorporation of Attock Refinery Limited as a private limited company in 1978. The initial paid-up capital of the new company was PKR 80 million, subscribed by Attock Oil Company, the Government of Pakistan, and the general public. In June 1979, Attock Refinery was listed on the Karachi Stock Exchange.

During this period, Attock Refinery maintained its aging equipment in good working condition through established maintenance practices. Despite this, the anticipated increase in locally sourced crude oil necessitated a substantial expansion of the refinery, as also stipulated under an existing agreement with the Government of Pakistan.

In 1980, Attock Refinery initiated its first major expansion project since 1937 and established a project management cell for this purpose. In March 1980, a 5,000-barrel per day refining unit was installed, followed by the addition of a 20,000 bpd unit in February 1981. These upgrades increased the refinery’s total processing capacity to 30,500 bpd.

In the early 1990s, Attock Refinery faced operational constraints due to its capacity to process only light crude, which yields higher proportions of gasoline and kerosene, in contrast to heavy crude oil that contains higher residual content. Additionally, the refinery's gasoline production, with a lead content of 0.42 grams per liter and an octane rating of 80, did not comply with the newly introduced National Environmental Quality Standards that required lower lead levels in motor gasoline. To address these challenges, as well as the anticipated shortage of suitable crude supply, the company sought to enhance its capability to produce 87-octane gasoline.

In March 1994, the Government of Pakistan introduced the Petroleum Policy, which removed profit caps for refineries undertaking expansion and development. Prior to this policy, the oil refining industry in Pakistan was highly regulated, guaranteeing a minimum net after-tax return of 10 percent on issued capital while taxing returns exceeding 40 percent. In response to the revised policy framework, Attock Refinery initiated the Refinery Upgradation and Expansion (ARU) Project. Subsequently, Hagler Bailey was commissioned to conduct a feasibility study, including sensitivity analyses assessing the impact of different crude oil types on project viability. The study confirmed the project's feasibility under varying conditions, which lead the Board of Directors to approve the ARU Project by the end of 1994. The ARU project comprised two key components: the installation of a catalytic reformer unit to produce 87 octane gasoline with a reduced lead content of 0.35 grams per liter, and the replacement of the outdated 5,500-bpd heavy crude unit with a new, more efficient 10,000-bpd unit.

In January 2003, the Government of Pakistan sold its 35 percent stake in Attock Refinery to general public for PKR 102 per share.

== Products ==
- Liquefied petroleum gas (LPG)
- Unleaded premium motor gasoline
- Mineral turpentine
- Kerosene oil
- High speed diesel
- Jet petroleum
- Petroleum solvents
- Light diesel oil
- Furnace fuel oil
- Paving grade asphalts

== Subsidiary ==
- National Refinery Limited (25%)

== See also ==
- Attock Group of Companies
- Karak Oil Refinery
