= 2024 F1 Powerboat World Championship =

2024 F1 Powerboat World Championship
Previous:	2023	Next:	2025

The 2024 UIM F1 H_{2}O World Championship is the 40th season of Formula 1 Powerboat racing.

== Teams and drivers ==
Team	Hull	Engine	No.	Race drivers	Rounds
Team Vietnam	DAC	Mercury 2.5 V6	1	(Sweden) Jonas Andersson	1–3
Team Vietnam	DAC	Mercury 2.5 V6	2	(Estonia) Stefan Arand	1–3
(United Arab Emirates) Victory Team	Victory	Mercury 2.5 V6	3	(United Arab Emirates) Ahmad Al Fahim	2–3
(United Arab Emirates) Victory Team	Victory	Mercury 2.5 V6	4	(Sweden) Erik Stark	1–3
(United Arab Emirates) Team Abu Dhabi	DAC	Mercury 2.5 V6	5	(United Arab Emirates) Thani Al Qemzi	1–3
(United Arab Emirates) Team Abu Dhabi	DAC	Mercury 2.5 V6	6	(Italy) Alberto Comparato	1–3
(United Arab Emirates) Team Abu Dhabi	DAC	Mercury 2.5 V6	16	(United Arab Emirates) Rashed Al Qemzi	2
China CTIC Team	Moore	Mercury 2.5 V6	7	(France) Peter Morin	1–3
China CTIC Team	Moore	Mercury 2.5 V6	8	(United States) Brent Dillard	1–3
(Portugal) F1 Atlantic Team	Moore	Mercury 2.5 V6	9	(United Kingdom) Ben Jelf	1–3
(Portugal) F1 Atlantic Team	Moore	Mercury 2.5 V6	10	(Portugal) Duarte Benavente	1–3
(Finland) Red Devil - SMC F1 Team	BaBa	Mercury 2.5 V6	11	(Finland) Sami Seliö	1–3
(Finland) Red Devil - SMC F1 Team	BaBa	Mercury 2.5 V6	12	(Netherlands) Ferdinand Zandbergen	1–3
(United Arab Emirates) Sharjah Team	BaBa	Mercury 2.5 V6	17	(Canada) Rusty Wyatt	1–3
(United Arab Emirates) Sharjah Team	BaBa	Mercury 2.5 V6	18	(Finland) Flip Roms	1–3
(Norway) Strømøy Racing	BaBa	Mercury 2.5 V6	50	(Norway) Marit Strømøy	1–3
(Norway) Strømøy Racing	DAC	Mercury 2.5 V6	77	(Poland) Bartek Marszalek	1–3
(France) Maverick Racing	DAC	Mercury 2.5 V6	73	(France) Cédric Deguisne	1–3
(France) Maverick Racing	DAC	Mercury 2.5 V6	74	(France) Alexandre Bourgeot	1–3

== Season calendar ==
Round	Race title	Date	Circuit location	Race winner	Hull/Engine	Ref
1	Pertamina Grand Prix of Indonesia	1–3 March 2024	Lake Toba	(Canada) Rusty Wyatt	BaBa/Mercury	
2	Grand Prix of Binh Dinh - Vietnam	29–31 March 2024	Quy Nhon	(Sweden) Erik Stark	Victory/Mercury	
3	Regione Sardegna Grand Prix of Italy	14–16 June 2024	Olbia	(Canada) Rusty Wyatt	BaBa/Mercury	
4	Grand Prix of China	4–6 October 2024	Shanghai	(Canada) Rusty Wyatt	BaBa/Mercury	
5	New Development Grand Prix of Zhengzhou, China	17-19 October 2024	Zhengzhou	(Sweden) Jonas Andersson	BaBa/Mercury	
6	(United Arab Emirates) Road to Sharjah - Grand Prix of Sharjah	6–8 December 2023	Sharjah	(Sweden) Jonas Andersson	BaBa/Mercury	
