= 2021 F1 Powerboat World Championship =

2021 F1 Powerboat World Championship
Previous:	2019	Next:	2022

The 2021 UIM F1 H_{2}O World Championship was the 37th season of Formula 1 Powerboat racing. Jonas Andersson won the championship.

== Teams and drivers ==
Team	Hull	Engine	No.	Race drivers	Rounds
(United Arab Emirates) Abu Dhabi Team	DAC	Mercury 2.5 V6	1	(United States) Shaun Torrente	All
(United Arab Emirates) Abu Dhabi Team	DAC	Mercury 2.5 V6	2	(United Arab Emirates) Thani Al Qemzi	All
(United States) Gillman Racing	DAC	Mercury 2.5 V6	3	(Sweden) Erik Stark	1
(United States) Gillman Racing	DAC	Mercury 2.5 V6	66	(Finland) Alec Weckström	All
CTIC F1 Shenzhen China Team	Moore	Mercury 2.5 V6	7	(France) Philippe Chiappe	1
CTIC F1 Shenzhen China Team	Moore	Mercury 2.5 V6	8	(France) Peter Morin	All
(Portugal) F1 Atlantic Team	Moore	Mercury 2.5 V6	10	(Portugal) Duarte Benavente	All
(United Arab Emirates) Sharjah Team	BaBa	Mercury 2.5 V6	11	(Finland) Sami Seliö	All
(United Arab Emirates) Sharjah Team	BaBa	Mercury 2.5 V6	12	(Finland) Filip Roms	All
(United Arab Emirates) Sharjah Team	BaBa	Mercury 2.5 V6	71	(Netherlands) Ferdinand Zandbergen	2–3
Team Sweden	DAC	Mercury 2.5 V6	14	(Sweden) Jonas Andersson	All
Team Sweden	Molgaard	Mercury 2.5 V6	15	(Finland) Kalle Viippo	All
(Italy) Blaze Performance	DAC	Mercury 2.5 V6	36	(Germany) Simone Bianca Schuft	1
(Italy) Blaze Performance	Blaze	Mercury 2.5 V6	37	(Italy) Francesco Cantando	1
(Norway) Strømøy Racing F1 H2O Team	BaBa	Mercury 2.5 V6	50	(Norway) Marit Strømøy	All
(Norway) Strømøy Racing F1 H2O Team	DAC	Mercury 2.5 V6	77	(Poland) Bartek Marszalek	All
(France) Maverick Racing	DAC	Mercury 2.5 V6	73	(France) Cédric Deguisne	All
(France) Maverick Racing	DAC	Mercury 2.5 V6	74	(France) Alexandre Bourgeot	All
(Italy) Alberto Comparato	DAC	Mercury 2.5 V6	97	(Italy) Alberto Comparato	All

== Season calendar ==
Round	Race title	Date	Circuit location	Race winner	Hull/Engine	Ref
1	(Italy) Grand Prix of Europe	12 September	San Nazzaro d'Ongina	(United Arab Emirates) Thani Al Qemzi	DAC/Mercury	
2	(Portugal) Grand Prix of Figueira da Foz	26 November	Figueira da Foz	(Sweden) Jonas Andersson	DAC/Mercury	
3	Grand Prix of Portugal	28 November	Figueira da Foz	(Sweden) Jonas Andersson	DAC/Mercury	

== Results and standings ==
Points are awarded to the top 10 classified finishers. A maximum of two boats per team are eligible for points in the teams' championship.

Position	**1st**	**2nd**	**3rd**	**4th**	**5th**	**6th**	**7th**	**8th**	**9th**	**10th**
Points	20	15	12	9	7	5	4	3	2	1

=== Drivers standings ===
Pos	Driver	EUR (Italy)	FIG (Portugal)	POR (Portugal)	Points
1	(Sweden) Jonas Andersson	Ret	**1**	**1**	40
2	(United Arab Emirates) Thani Al Qamzi	1	5	3	39
3	(United States) Shaun Torrente	2	2	5	37
4	(France) Peter Morin	4	7	4	22
5	(Finland) Alec Weckstrom	DNS	10	2	16
6	(Norway) Marit Strømøy	Ret	3	Ret	12
7	(Finland) Sami Seliö	3	Ret	Ret	12
8	(Poland) Bartek Marszalek	5	Ret	7	11
9	(Finland) Kalle Viippo	DNS	6	6	10
10	(Netherlands) Ferdinand Zandbergen		4	Ret	9
11	(France) Cédric Deguisne	7	13	9	6
12	(France) Alexandre Bourgeot	6	11	DNS	5
13	(Portugal) Duarte Benavente	DNS	9	8	5
14	(Italy) Alberto Comparato	**Ret**	8	Ret	3
15	(Germany) Simone Bianca Schuft	8			3
16	(Italy) Francesco Cantando	9			2
17	(France) Philippe Chiappe	Ret			0
18	(Finland) Filip Roms	Ret	12	Ret	0
19	(Sweden) Erik Stark	Ret			0

Key
Colour	Result
Gold	Winner
Silver	Second place
Bronze	Third place
Green	Other points position
Blue	Other classified position
Blue	Not classified, finished (NC)
Purple	Not classified, retired (Ret)
Red	Did not qualify (DNQ)
Red	Did not pre-qualify (DNPQ)
Black	Disqualified (DSQ)
White	Did not start (DNS)
White	Race cancelled (C)
Blank	Did not practice (DNP)
Blank	Excluded (EX)
Blank	Did not arrive (DNA)
Blank	Withdrawn (WD)
Blank	Did not enter (cell empty)
Text formatting	Meaning
**Bold**	Pole position
Italics	Fastest lap

**Bold** – Pole position
Italics – Fastest lap
