= 2023 F1 Powerboat World Championship =

2023 F1 Powerboat World Championship
Previous:	2022	Next:	2024

The 2023 UIM F1 H_{2}O World Championship was the 39th season of Formula 1 Powerboat racing. Jonas Andersson won the championship.

== Teams and drivers ==
Team	Hull	Engine	No.	Race drivers	Rounds
(United Arab Emirates) Abu Dhabi Team	DAC	Mercury 2.5 V6	1	(United States) Shaun Torrente	1–3
(United Arab Emirates) Abu Dhabi Team	DAC	Mercury 2.5 V6	2	(United Arab Emirates) Thani Al Qemzi	1, 3–5
(United Arab Emirates) Abu Dhabi Team	DAC	Mercury 2.5 V6	5	(United Arab Emirates) Rashed Al Qemzi	2, 4–5
(United Arab Emirates) Victory Team	Victory	Mercury 2.5 V6	3	(United Arab Emirates) Ahmad Al Fahim	1–4
(United Arab Emirates) Victory Team	Victory	Mercury 2.5 V6	4	(Sweden) Erik Stark	All
China CTIC Team	Moore	Mercury 2.5 V6	7	(France) Peter Morin	All
China CTIC Team	Moore	Mercury 2.5 V6	8	(United States) Brent Dillard	All
(Portugal) F1 Atlantic Team	Moore	Mercury 2.5 V6	9	(United Kingdom) Ben Jelf	All
(Portugal) F1 Atlantic Team	Moore	Mercury 2.5 V6	10	(Portugal) Duarte Benavente	1–3, 5
(United Arab Emirates) Sharjah Team	BaBa	Mercury 2.5 V6	11	(Finland) Sami Seliö	1–3, 5
(United Arab Emirates) Sharjah Team	BaBa	Mercury 2.5 V6	12	(Netherlands) Ferdinand Zandbergen	All
Team Sweden	DAC	Mercury 2.5 V6	14	(Sweden) Jonas Andersson	All
Team Sweden	Molgaard	Mercury 2.5 V6	15	(Finland) Kalle Viippo	All
(Norway) Strømøy Racing F1 H_{2}O Team	BaBa	Mercury 2.5 V6	50	(Norway) Marit Strømøy	All
(Norway) Strømøy Racing F1 H_{2}O Team	DAC	Mercury 2.5 V6	77	(Poland) Bartek Marszalek	All
(France) Maverick Racing	DAC	Mercury 2.5 V6	73	(France) Cédric Deguisne	1–3, 5
(France) Maverick Racing	DAC	Mercury 2.5 V6	74	(France) Alexandre Bourgeot	1–3, 5
(United States) Mad Croc Gillman Racing	DAC	Mercury 2.5 V6	55	(Finland) Flip Roms	1–4
(United States) Mad Croc Gillman Racing	DAC	Mercury 2.5 V6	66	(Australia) Grant Trask	2–5
(Italy) Comparato F1	DAC	Mercury 2.5 V6	97	(Italy) Alberto Comparato	All
(Italy) Comparato F1	DAC	Mercury 2.5 V6	98	(Australia) Brock Cohen	All

== Season calendar ==
Round	Race title	Date	Circuit location	Race winner	Hull/Engine	Ref
1	Kopiko Grand Prix of Indonesia	24–26 February 2023	Lake Toba	(Poland) Bartek Marszalek	DAC/Mercury	
2	Grand Prix of Zhengzhou, China	28–30 April 2023	Zhengzhou	(Sweden) Jonas Andersson	DAC/Mercury	
3	Grand Prix of France	30 June–2 July 2023	Mâcon	(Sweden) Jonas Andersson	DAC/Mercury	
4	Regione Sardegna Grand Prix of Italy	29 September–1 October 2023	Olbia	(Sweden) Jonas Andersson	DAC/Mercury	
5	(United Arab Emirates) Road to Sharjah - Grand Prix of Sharjah	8–10 December 2023	Sharjah	(Sweden) Jonas Andersson	DAC/Mercury	
