= 2022 F1 Powerboat World Championship =

2022 F1 Powerboat World Championship
Previous:	2021	Next:	2023

The 2022 UIM F1 H_{2}O World Championship was the 38th season of Formula 1 Powerboat racing. Shaun Torrente won the championship.

== Teams and drivers ==
Team	Hull	Engine	No.	Race drivers	Rounds
(United Arab Emirates) Abu Dhabi Team	DAC	Mercury 2.5 V6	1	(United States) Shaun Torrente	All
(United Arab Emirates) Abu Dhabi Team	DAC	Mercury 2.5 V6	2	(United Arab Emirates) Thani Al Qemzi	All
(United States) Gillman Racing	DAC	Mercury 2.5 V6	3	(Sweden) Erik Stark	1
(United States) Gillman Racing	DAC	Mercury 2.5 V6	66	(Finland) Alec Weckstrom	All
CTIC F1 Shenzhen China Team	Moore	Mercury 2.5 V6	7	(France) Philippe Chiappe	All
CTIC F1 Shenzhen China Team	Moore	Mercury 2.5 V6	8	(France) Peter Morin	All
(Portugal) F1 Atlantic Team	Moore	Mercury 2.5 V6	10	(Portugal) Duarte Benavente	All
(United Arab Emirates) Sharjah Team	BaBa	Mercury 2.5 V6	11	(Finland) Sami Seliö	All
(United Arab Emirates) Sharjah Team	BaBa	Mercury 2.5 V6	12	(Finland) Filip Roms	All
(United Arab Emirates) Sharjah Team	BaBa	Mercury 2.5 V6	71	(Netherlands) Ferdinand Zandbergen	All
Team Sweden	DAC	Mercury 2.5 V6	14	(Sweden) Jonas Andersson	All
Team Sweden	Molgaard	Mercury 2.5 V6	15	(Finland) Kalle Viippo	All
(Italy) Blaze Performance	DAC	Mercury 2.5 V6	36	(Germany) Simone Bianca Schuft	1
(Italy) Blaze Performance	Blaze	Mercury 2.5 V6	37	(Italy) Francesco Cantando	1
(Norway) Strømøy Racing F1 H_{2}O Team	BaBa	Mercury 2.5 V6	50	(Norway) Marit Strømøy	1
(Norway) Strømøy Racing F1 H_{2}O Team	DAC	Mercury 2.5 V6	77	(Poland) Bartek Marszalek	All
(France) Maverick Racing	DAC	Mercury 2.5 V6	73	(France) Cédric Deguisne	All
(France) Maverick Racing	DAC	Mercury 2.5 V6	74	(France) Alexandre Bourgeot	All
(Italy) Alberto Comparato	DAC	Mercury 2.5 V6	97	(Italy) Alberto Comparato	2–3

== Season calendar ==
Round	Race title	Date	Circuit location	Race winner	Hull/Engine	Ref
1	Grand Prix of France	3–5 June 2022	Mâcon	(United States) Shaun Torrente	DAC/Mercury	
2	(Italy) Grand Prix of Regione Emilia Romagna	23–24 September 2022	San Nazzaro	(United States) Shaun Torrente	DAC/Mercury	
3	(Italy) Grand Prix of ITALY	25 September 2022	San Nazzaro	(Netherlands) Ferdinand Zandbergen	BaBa/Mercury	
4	(Italy) Grand Prix of Regione Sardegna	14–16 October 2022	Olbia	(United Arab Emirates) Thani Al Qemzi	DAC/Mercury	
5	(United Arab Emirates) Grand Prix of Sharjah	15–16 December 2022	Sharjah	(Sweden) Jonas Andersson	DAC/Mercury	
6	(United Arab Emirates) Grand Prix of Middle East	18 December 2022	Sharjah	(France) Philippe Chiappe	Moore/Mercury	
