= 2019 F1 Powerboat World Championship =

2019 F1 Powerboat World Championship
Previous:	2018	Next:	2021

The 2019 UIM F1 H_{2}O World Championship was the 36th season of Formula 1 Powerboat racing.

== Teams and drivers ==
Team	Hull	Engine	No.	Race drivers	Rounds
(United Arab Emirates) Team Abu Dhabi	DAC	Mercury 2.5 V6	1	(United States) Shaun Torrente	All
(United Arab Emirates) Team Abu Dhabi	DAC	Mercury 2.5 V6	2	(United Arab Emirates) Thani Al Qamzi	All
(United Arab Emirates) Victory Team	Victory	Mercury 2.5 V6	3	(United Arab Emirates) Ahmed Al Hameli	1–3
(United Arab Emirates) Victory Team	Victory	Mercury 2.5 V6	33	(Italy) David Del Pin	4–6
(United Arab Emirates) Victory Team	Victory	Mercury 2.5 V6	44	(Italy) Alex Carella	1
(United Arab Emirates) Victory Team	DAC	Mercury 2.5 V6	44	(Italy) Alex Carella	2–3
(United Arab Emirates) Victory Team	DAC	Mercury 2.5 V6	74	(Sweden) Erik Stark	4–6
CTIC F1 Shenzhen China	Moore	Mercury 2.5 V6	7	(France) Philippe Chiappe	All
CTIC F1 Shenzhen China	Moore	Mercury 2.5 V6	8	(France) Peter Morin	All
(Portugal) F1 Atlantic Team	DAC	Mercury 2.5 V6	9	(Italy) Alberto Comparato	All
(Portugal) F1 Atlantic Team	Moore	Mercury 2.5 V6	10	(Portugal) Duarte Benavente	All
(United Arab Emirates) Sharjah Team	BaBa	Mercury 2.5 V6	11	(Finland) Sami Seliö	All
(United Arab Emirates) Sharjah Team	BaBa	Mercury 2.5 V6	12	(Finland) Filip Roms	All
Team Sweden	DAC	Mercury 2.5 V6	14	(Sweden) Jonas Andersson	All
Team Sweden	DAC	Mercury 2.5 V6	15	(Sweden) Erik Edin	All
(Italy) Blaze Performance	DAC	Mercury 2.5 V6	36	(United States) Greg Foster	All
(Italy) Blaze Performance	Blaze	Mercury 2.5 V6	37	(Italy) Francesco Cantando	All
(France) Maverick F1 Racing	DAC	Mercury 2.5 V6	44	(Italy) Alex Carella	4–6
(France) Maverick F1 Racing	DAC	Mercury 2.5 V6	70	(France) Béranger Robart	2–3
(France) Maverick F1 Racing	Moore	Mercury 2.5 V6	73	(France) Cédric Deguisne	All
(France) Maverick F1 Racing	DAC	Mercury 2.5 V6	74	(France) Béranger Robart	1
(France) Maverick F1 Racing	DAC	Mercury 2.5 V6	74	(Sweden) Erik Stark	2–3
(United Arab Emirates) Emirates Racing Team	BaBa	Mercury 2.5 V6	50	(Norway) Marit Strømøy	All
(United Arab Emirates) Emirates Racing Team	DAC	Mercury 2.5 V6	51	(Poland) Bartek Marszalek	1–2
(United Arab Emirates) Emirates Racing Team	DAC	Mercury 2.5 V6	77	(Poland) Bartek Marszalek	3–6

== Season calendar ==
Round	Race title	Date	Circuit location	Race winner	Hull/Engine
1	Grand Prix of Saudi Arabia	30 March	Dammam	Race cancelled (Note: The round was halted due to bad weather, after a shortened qualifying session)	
2	Grand Prix of Portugal - Algarve	19 May	Portimão	(United States) Shaun Torrente	DAC/Mercury
3	Grand Prix of France	7 July	Évian-les-Bains	(Sweden) Jonas Andersson	DAC/Mercury
4	(China) Grand Prix of Xiamen	19 October	Xiamen	(Italy) Alex Carella	DAC/Mercury
5	Grand Prix of China	20 October	Xiamen	(United States) Shaun Torrente	DAC/Mercury
6	(United Arab Emirates) Grand Prix of Sharjah	21 December	Sharjah	(Sweden) Jonas Andersson	DAC/Mercury

== Results and standings ==
Points are awarded to the top 10 classified finishers. A maximum of two boats per team are eligible for points in the teams' championship.

Position	**1st**	**2nd**	**3rd**	**4th**	**5th**	**6th**	**7th**	**8th**	**9th**	**10th**
Points	20	15	12	9	7	5	4	3	2	1

=== Drivers standings ===
Pos	Driver	SAU (Saudi Arabia)	POR (Portugal)	FRA (France)	XIA (China)	CHN (China)	SHA (United Arab Emirates)	Points
1	(United States) Shaun Torrente	C	**1**	2	4	**1**	2	79
2	(Sweden) Jonas Andersson	C	3	1	2	3	**1**	79
3	(Norway) Marit Strømøy	C	5	4	3	4	Ret	37
4	(United Arab Emirates) Thani Al Qamzi	C	2	3	Ret	Ret	DSQ	27
5	(Poland) Bartek Marszalek	C	6	8	9	7	3	26
6	(Italy) Alex Carella	C	Ret	6	**1**	Ret	Ret	25
7	(France) Peter Morin	C	4	5	5	Ret	Ret	23
8	(France) Philippe Chiappe	C	Ret	**Ret**	Ret	2	5	22
9	(Finland) Sami Seliö	C	10	Ret	Ret	6	4	15
10	(Italy) Alberto Comparato	C	8	DNS	7	10	6	13
11	(United States) Greg Foster	C	Ret	7	6	8	Ret	12
12	(Sweden) Erik Edin	C	Ret	Ret	8	5	Ret	10
13	(Italy) David Del Pin	C			14	9	7	6
14	(United Arab Emirates) Ahmed Al Hameli	C	7	Ret				4
15	(France) Cédric Deguisne	C	12	Ret	13	Ret	8	3
16	(Sweden) Erik Stark	C	9	10	11	Ret	Ret	3
17	(Portugal) Duarte Benavente	C	11	9	10	DNS	Ret	3
18	(Finland) Filip Roms	C	Ret	11	12	Ret	Ret	0
19	(France) Béranger Robart	C	13	12				0
20	(Italy) Francesco Cantando	C	Ret	Ret	Ret	Ret	Ret	0

Key
Colour	Result
Gold	Winner
Silver	Second place
Bronze	Third place
Green	Other points position
Blue	Other classified position
Blue	Not classified, finished (NC)
Purple	Not classified, retired (Ret)
Red	Did not qualify (DNQ)
Red	Did not pre-qualify (DNPQ)
Black	Disqualified (DSQ)
White	Did not start (DNS)
White	Race cancelled (C)
Blank	Did not practice (DNP)
Blank	Excluded (EX)
Blank	Did not arrive (DNA)
Blank	Withdrawn (WD)
Blank	Did not enter (cell empty)
Text formatting	Meaning
**Bold**	Pole position
Italics	Fastest lap

**Bold** – Pole position
Italics – Fastest lap
