= Hilmer Wiberg =

Swedish powerboat racer

- Born: 2005 (age 20–21); Sweden
- Occupation: Professional powerboat racer
- Years active: 2016–present
- Known for: Multiple UIM World Championships, 2025 F2 World Championship runner-up
- Family: Mathilda Wiberg (sister, 2025 F2 World Champion)
- Awards: 2018 GT15 World Championship (silver); 2019 GT15 European Champion; 2019 3J European Championship (silver); 2020 GT15 World Champion; 2021 GT30 European Championship (bronze); 2022 GT30 World Champion; 2022 3J World Champion; 2022 GT30 European Champion; 2022 GT30 Nordic Champion; 2023 F4 European Championship (bronze); 2023 Endurance S3 (silver); 2024 F4 European Championship (bronze); 2025 F2 European Championship (bronze); 2025 F2 World Championship (silver); 2026 S3 World Endurance Championship (silver)

Hilmer Wiberg (born 2005) is a Swedish powerboat racer who has achieved multiple world championships across different racing categories. He is best known for winning the 2022 GT30 World Championship and being the runner-up in the 2025 UIM F2 World Championship, where he finished second to his sister Mathilda Wiberg in a dramatic season finale. Wiberg is a prominent member of the Swedish powerboat racing scene and represents the Wiberg Racing team alongside his sister.

== Early life and family background ==
Wiberg comes from a powerboat racing family based in Åkersberga, Sweden, located about 40 km north of Stockholm. His father introduced both Hilmer and his sister Mathilda to the sport, and the entire Wiberg family travels to races together as a team under the banner of Wiberg Racing.

Hilmer began his powerboat racing career in the mid-2010s, competing alongside his younger sister Mathilda in various junior categories before progressing to senior-level competition.

== Racing career ==
=== Junior championships (2016-2020) ===
Wiberg's breakthrough year came in 2019 when he achieved multiple championship successes. He won the GT15 European Championship, demonstrating his skill in the junior category where drivers compete until age 16. The same year, he earned a silver medal in the UIM Class 3J World Championship, partnering with William Sjöström while his sister Mathilda and Stefan Arand won the gold.

The racing media noted that this gave "the family another medal" and highlighted the competitive nature of the Wiberg siblings even in their early careers.

=== GT30 dominance (2020-2022) ===
After aging out of GT15, Wiberg moved to the GT30 category where he achieved considerable success. In 2022, he dominated the GT30 World Championship, with racing media reporting that "Hilmer Wiberg from Sweden won the GT 30 Worldchampionship" ahead of Laura Lakovica from Latvia in second place and Kärol Soodla from Estonia in third.

His dominance in GT30 was also evident in other competitions, with reports of him taking "all three heat victories in GT30" at various race meetings.

=== Formula 2 career (2025) ===
Wiberg's transition to the premier UIM F2 World Championship category marked the next phase of his career, where he would ultimately compete directly against his sister Mathilda for world championship honours.

==== 2025 season ====
In 2025, Wiberg achieved a bronze medal in the F2 European Championship in his rookie season, finishing third behind Nikita Lijcs and Edgaras Riabko.

Throughout the World Championship, he secured multiple podium finishes, including a third-place finish in the season opener at Brindisi, Italy, where he finished behind winner Matthew Palfreyman and runner-up Peter Morin.

Going into the championship-deciding final race in Vila Velha de Ródão, Portugal, Wiberg held the championship lead with 39 points, ahead of his sister Mathilda (34 points) and Peter Morin (32 points).

==== The dramatic finale ====
The championship-deciding race on 21 September 2025 proved to be one of the most dramatic in F2 history. Starting from fifth position on the grid, Wiberg was in contention for the title when disaster struck. On lap 25, "championship leader Hilmer Wiberg's title challenge unravelled when technical gremlins forced his retirement, ending his hopes."

The mechanical failure eliminated Wiberg from the race at the crucial moment, allowing his sister Mathilda to take control and ultimately claim both the race victory and the world championship. Despite the disappointment of losing the title, Hilmer was classified as the championship runner-up, finishing second in the final standings.

=== S3 World Endurance Championship (2026) ===
In May 2026, Wiberg raced for Monsnauteam alongside Benjamin Berti, Maverick Grolet and Adam Wrenkler at the 24 Heures Motonautiques de Normandie at Poses, which served as the entire 2026 UIM S3 World Endurance Championship. Monsnauteam won Race 2 on Saturday and finished second in Race 3 on Sunday, securing the vice-championship title with 50 points behind winners Team Touax MRK Racing on 57 points.

== Achievements and records ==
- 2022 GT30 World Champion
- 2019 GT15 European Champion
- 2019 UIM Class 3J World Championship - Silver medal (with William Sjöström)
- 2025 F2 European Championship - Bronze medal
- 2025 UIM F2 World Championship - Silver medal
- 2026 UIM S3 World Endurance Championship - Silver medal (with Monsnauteam)

== Family racing legacy ==
The 2025 F2 World Championship represented a unique situation in motorsport, with siblings Hilmer and Mathilda Wiberg competing directly against each other for the world title. This family rivalry captured international attention and highlighted the strength of Swedish powerboat racing.

The dramatic conclusion, where mechanical failure ended Hilmer's championship hopes while simultaneously opening the door for Mathilda's historic victory, created one of motorsport's most poignant moments. As reported by racing media: "Her triumph came after a race punctuated by mechanical failures that eliminated both her championship rivals—championship leader Hilmer Wiberg retiring with a technical issue on lap 25."

Despite losing the championship, Hilmer's sportsmanship and the family's unity were evident in the post-race celebrations, demonstrating the close bond between the racing siblings.

== Equipment and team ==
Wiberg races for Wiberg Racing, the family team that has achieved multiple world championships across different categories including 3J, GT30, and GT15, plus European championships in GT30 and GT15. The team is known for its professional approach and has been a consistent presence in international powerboat racing for several years.

== Legacy and impact ==
Hilmer Wiberg is a Swedish powerboat racer who has won world championships in categories ranging from junior levels to the F2 class. He has competed in the GT15, GT30, and F2 categories, winning European and World championships in the GT15 and GT30 classes respectively.

His role in the historic 2025 F2 World Championship, while ending in disappointment for his own title ambitions, contributed to one of motorsport's most significant moments when his sister became the first woman to win a Formula-class world championship in any form of motorsport.

== Personal life ==
Wiberg continues to race professionally while maintaining strong family ties to the sport. The Wiberg Racing team operates as a family unit, with both siblings and their parents traveling to races together throughout Europe and beyond.

== See also ==
- Mathilda Wiberg
- UIM F2 World Championship
- Powerboat racing
- Wiberg Racing
