= 2018 F1 Powerboat World Championship =

2018 F1 Powerboat World Championship
Previous:	2017	Next:	2019

The 2018 UIM F1 H_{2}O World Championship was the 35th season of Formula 1 Powerboat racing.

== Teams and drivers ==
Team	Hull	Engine	No.	Race drivers	Rounds	Reserve driver(s)
(United Arab Emirates) Victory Team	Victory	Mercury 2.5 V6	1	(Italy) Alex Carella	1–2, 4–7	
(United Arab Emirates) Victory Team	BaBa	Mercury 2.5 V6	1	(Italy) Alex Carella	3	
(United Arab Emirates) Victory Team	Victory	Mercury 2.5 V6	3	(United Arab Emirates) Ahmed Al Hameli	All	
(United Arab Emirates) Team Abu Dhabi	DAC	Mercury 2.5 V6	5	(United Arab Emirates) Thani Al Qamzi	All	
(United Arab Emirates) Team Abu Dhabi	DAC	Mercury 2.5 V6	6	(United States) Shaun Torrente	All	
(United Arab Emirates) Team Abu Dhabi	DAC	Mercury 2.5 V6	35	(United Arab Emirates) Rashed Al Qamzi	1	
(United Arab Emirates) Team Abu Dhabi	DAC	Mercury 2.5 V6	35	(Sweden) Erik Stark	3–7	
CTIC F1 Shenzhen China	Moore	Mercury 2.5 V6	7	(France) Philippe Chiappe	All	
CTIC F1 Shenzhen China	Moore	Mercury 2.5 V6	8	(France) Peter Morin	All	
(Portugal) F1 Atlantic Team	DAC	Mercury 2.5 V6	9	(Australia) Grant Trask	All	
(Portugal) F1 Atlantic Team	Moore	Mercury 2.5 V6	10	(Portugal) Duarte Benavente	All	
(Italy) Mad-Croc BaBa Racing	BaBa	Mercury 2.5 V6	11	(Finland) Sami Seliö	All	
(Italy) Mad-Croc BaBa Racing	BaBa	Mercury 2.5 V6	12	(Finland) Filip Roms	All	
Team Sweden	DAC	Mercury 2.5 V6	14	(Sweden) Jonas Andersson	All	
Team Sweden	DAC	Mercury 2.5 V6	15	(Sweden) Erik Edin	All	
(Italy) Blaze Performance	DAC	Mercury 2.5 V6	36	(Germany) Simone Bianca Schuft	All	
(Italy) Blaze Performance	Blaze	Mercury 2.5 V6	37	(Italy) Francesco Cantando	All	
(United Arab Emirates) Emirates Racing Team	BaBa	Mercury 2.5 V6	50	(Norway) Marit Strømøy	All	
(United Arab Emirates) Emirates Racing Team	DAC	Mercury 2.5 V6	51	(Poland) Bartek Marszalek	All	
(France) Maverick F1 Racing	Moore	Mercury 2.5 V6	70	(Norway) Mette Brandt Bjerknæs	2	
(France) Maverick F1 Racing	Moore	Mercury 2.5 V6	73	(France) Cédric Deguisne	All	
(France) Maverick F1 Racing	DAC	Mercury 2.5 V6	74	(Sweden) Erik Stark	1–2	
(France) Maverick F1 Racing	Moore	Mercury 2.5 V6	74	(Norway) Mette Brandt Bjerknæs	3	
(France) Maverick F1 Racing	Moore	Mercury 2.5 V6	74	(Thailand) Sutthipan Sookbuangbon	4–7	

== Season calendar ==
Round	Race title	Date	Circuit location	Race winner	Hull/Engine
1	17th Grand Prix of Portugal	20 May	Portimão	(United States) Shaun Torrente	DAC/Mercury
2	(United Kingdom) Grand Prix of London	17 June	London	(Sweden) Erik Stark	DAC/Mercury
3	22nd Grand Prix of France	1 July	Évian-les-Bains	(Sweden) Erik Stark	DAC/Mercury
4	23rd Grand Prix of China	23 September	Xiangyang	(United States) Shaun Torrente	DAC/Mercury
5	Grand Prix of India	18 November	Amaravati	(United States) Shaun Torrente	DAC/Mercury
6	(United Arab Emirates) 26th Grand Prix of Abu Dhabi	8 December	Abu Dhabi	(United Arab Emirates) Thani Al Qamzi	DAC/Mercury
7	(United Arab Emirates) 19th Grand Prix of Sharjah	15 December	Sharjah	(Sweden) Erik Stark	DAC/Mercury

== Results and standings ==
Points are awarded to the top 10 classified finishers. A maximum of two boats per team are eligible for points in the teams' championship.

Position	**1st**	**2nd**	**3rd**	**4th**	**5th**	**6th**	**7th**	**8th**	**9th**	**10th**
Points	20	15	12	9	7	5	4	3	2	1

=== Drivers standings ===
Pos	Driver	POR (Portugal)	GBR (United Kingdom)	FRA (France)	CHN (China)	IND (India)	ABU (United Arab Emirates)	SHA (United Arab Emirates)	Points
1	(United States) Shaun Torrente	**1**	Ret	3	**1**	**1**	6	3	89
2	(Sweden) Erik Stark	10	**1**	**1**	3	3	**Ret**	**1**	85
3	(United Arab Emirates) Thani Al Qamzi	2	4	2	2	Ret	1	Ret	74
4	(France) Peter Morin	5	3	5	7	4	2	Ret	54
5	(France) Philippe Chiappe	3	2	15	5	Ret	8	6	42
6	(Norway) Marit Strømøy	Ret	7	7	8	2	4	Ret	35
7	(Sweden) Jonas Andersson	Ret	Ret	6	4	Ret	Ret	2	29
8	(Finland) Sami Seliö	DNS	5	Ret	Ret	DNS	3	4	28
9	(Sweden) Erik Edin	9	Ret	4	9	6	Ret	5	25
10	(United Arab Emirates) Ahmed Al Hameli	6	8	9	6	8	DNS	DNS	18
11	(Italy) Francesco Cantando	8	Ret	14	DNS	5	5	10	18
12	(Italy) Alex Carella	4	Ret	Ret	Ret	Ret	Ret	Ret	9
13	(Finland) Filip Roms	Ret	DNS	Ret	12	7	10	7	9
14	(Australia) Grant Trask	14	6	12	Ret	Ret	Ret	8	8
15	(Poland) Bartek Marszalek	11	DNS	8	10	Ret	7	Ret	8
16	(France) Cedric Deguisne	12	9	10	11	Ret	9	9	7
17	(Portugal) Duarte Benavente	7	10	11	Ret	Ret	11	DNS	5
18	(Germany) Simone Bianca Schuft	15	Ret	DNS	DNS	9	13	11	2
19	(Thailand) Sutthipan Sookbuangbon				13	10	DNP	Ret	1
20	(Norway) Mette Brandt Bjerknæs		11	13					0
	(United Arab Emirates) Rashed Al Qamzi	13							0

Key
Colour	Result
Gold	Winner
Silver	Second place
Bronze	Third place
Green	Other points position
Blue	Other classified position
Blue	Not classified, finished (NC)
Purple	Not classified, retired (Ret)
Red	Did not qualify (DNQ)
Red	Did not pre-qualify (DNPQ)
Black	Disqualified (DSQ)
White	Did not start (DNS)
White	Race cancelled (C)
Blank	Did not practice (DNP)
Blank	Excluded (EX)
Blank	Did not arrive (DNA)
Blank	Withdrawn (WD)
Blank	Did not enter (cell empty)
Text formatting	Meaning
**Bold**	Pole position
Italics	Fastest lap
