= Riabko =

Riabko is a surname. Notable people with the surname include:

- Alexandre Riabko (born 1978), Ukrainian ballet dancer
- Edgaras Riabko (born 1984), Lithuanian powerboat racer
- Kyle Riabko (born 1987), Canadian musician, composer, and actor
