= Stefan Arand =

Estonian motorboat racer

Personal information
- Nationality: Estonian
- Born: 2001 (age 24–25) Tallinn, Estonia
- Height: 1.84 m (6 ft 0 in)
- Weight: 90 kg (198 lb)

Sport
- Sport: Powerboat racing
- Club: Sharjah Team (2025–present); Team Bình Định-Viet Nam (2024); Stefan Arand Racing (2023)

Stefan Arand (born 2001) is an Estonian powerboat racer from Tallinn. He is a seven-time world champion and nine-time European champion across multiple powerboat racing categories. He became the first Estonian driver to compete in the F1H2O World Championship when he made his debut in 2024. He was three-time UIM Junior Driver of the Year from 2016 to 2018.

== Early career and junior championships ==
Arand began powerboat racing in 2012. He won back-to-back GT15 World and European Championships in 2014 and 2015. He won the GT15 World Championship again in 2016 and 2017, and the GT15 European Championship in 2017 and 2018. In the GT30 class, he won world championships in 2017 and 2018, and the European Championship in 2019.

His consistency across these championships earned him the UIM Junior Driver of the Year award three consecutive times in 2016, 2017 and 2018. In 2019, he won the Offshore 3J World Championship, demonstrating his versatility beyond circuit racing. He also secured a bronze medal in the S3 Endurance World Championship.

== F4 career ==
Arand won the F4 European Championship in 2021. In 2022, he won both the F4 World Championship and European Championship in his final season in the class. He finished ahead of Finland's Roope Virtanen and Sweden's Mathilda Wiberg in the four-round championship, accumulating 65 points.

== F2 career ==
In 2023, Arand made his debut in the UIM F2 World Championship racing under the Stefan Arand Racing banner with a DAC hull. He finished third overall behind Rashed Al-Qemzi and Edgaras Riabko, earning the bronze medal in his debut season. He was voted F2 Rookie of the Year. His top F2 result was winning the 2023 Baltic Cup.

In the 2025 F2 season, Arand competed over four rounds and finished seventh overall. His season highlight came at the final round in Vila Veha, where he secured fourth place after maintaining his position through multiple yellow flags.

== F1H2O career ==
=== 2024: Rookie season ===
In 2024, Arand made history as the first official driver to represent Estonia at the top level of powerboat racing when he joined the F1H2O World Championship. He raced for Team Bình Định-Viet Nam alongside defending World Champion Jonas Andersson. In December 2023, he was awarded the 2023 Driver of the Year at the Estonian Powerboating Union Awards' Ceremony.

His debut at the Pertamina Grand Prix of Indonesia on Lake Toba resulted in fourth place in both the sprint race and Grand Prix. At the inaugural Grand Prix of Vietnam in Quy Nhơn, he finished second in a sprint race behind his team-mate but failed to finish the Grand Prix. He finished fifth in the weather-shortened Grand Prix of Shanghai but did not start at Zhengzhou and was absent from the Sharjah finale. He finished 10th in the Drivers' Championship with 34.5 points, contributing to Team Vietnam winning the Teams' Championship.

=== 2025: Sharjah Team ===
For the 2025 season, Arand joined the Sharjah Team, partnering with Canadian Rusty Wyatt under team manager Scott Gillman. Gillman, a four-time F1H2O World Champion, provides mentorship for developing championship-calibre drivers.

Arand opened his campaign with fourth place at the Grand Prix of Indonesia on Lake Toba. At the Grand Prix of Shanghai in October, he claimed pole position with a time of 40.222 seconds, becoming the youngest-ever F1H2O pole-sitter at age 23. He dominated Sprint Race 1 from pole but suffered engine failure four laps from victory. An engine change relegated him to 19th on the grid for the Grand Prix.

Arand claimed his maiden F1H2O victory at the season finale in Sharjah on 21 December, winning by 12.594 seconds. He became the first Estonian driver to win a Grand Prix in the F1H2O class. He finished fourth in the championship with 83 points behind Shaun Torrente, Jonas Andersson and Rusty Wyatt, securing a contract renewal with Sharjah Team for 2026.

== Racing record ==
=== Championships ===
Year	Championship	Result
2022	UIM F4 World Championship	Champion
2022	UIM F4 European Championship	Champion
2021	UIM F4 European Championship	Champion
2019	Offshore 3J World Championship	Champion
2019	UIM GT30 European Championship	Champion
2018	UIM GT30 World Championship	Champion
2018	UIM GT15 European Championship	Champion
2017	UIM GT30 World Championship	Champion
2017	UIM GT15 World Championship	Champion
2017	UIM GT15 European Championship	Champion
2016	UIM GT15 World Championship	Champion
2015	UIM GT15 World Championship	Champion
2015	UIM GT15 European Championship	Champion
2014	UIM GT15 World Championship	Champion
2014	UIM GT15 European Championship	Champion
2023	UIM F2 World Championship	Bronze
2024	UIM F1H2O World Championship	10th
2025	UIM F1H2O World Championship	4th
2025	UIM F2 World Championship	7th

=== Awards ===
- UIM Junior Driver of the Year: 2016, 2017, 2018
- UIM F2 Rookie of the Year: 2023
- Estonian Powerboating Union Driver of the Year: 2023
