= UIM F2 World Championship =

- Category: Catamaran, single-engined, single-seater
- Country: International
- Constructors: BaBa · DAC · Molgaard · Moore
- Engine suppliers: Mercury Racing
- Drivers' champion: (Sweden) Mathilda Wiberg
- Official website: f2worldchamp.com

The F2 World Championship is an international powerboat racing competition organised by the Union Internationale Motonautique.

== The Boats ==
The carbon fibre catamaran hulls are powered by Mercury Racing OptiMax 2.5XS outboards.

== Qualifying ==
Qualifying periods (Q1, Q2 & Q3) decide the formation of the grid.

== Races ==
Each race lasts approximately 45 minutes following a circuit marked out in a selected stretch of water, usually a lake, river, dock, or sheltered bay.

== 2020 UIM F2 World Championship ==
Portugal's Duarte Benavente won the 2020 UIM F2 World Championship with Edgaras Riabko from Lithuania second and Britain's Owen Jelf third.

Due to the COVID-19 pandemic, a shortened season was held over three rounds in two countries, Lithuania and Portugal.

== 2025 UIM F2 World Championship ==
In 2025 Mathilda Wiberg rewrote motorsport history. The Swedish driver claimed victory at the Grand Prix of Portugal II to secure the 2025 UIM F2 World Championship, becoming the first woman ever to win a Formula-class world championship in any form of motorsport.

== UIM F2 World Speed Record Holder ==
Sam Whittle - 133.23 mph

== UIM F2 World Champions ==
Season	Overall winner
2006	(United Kingdom) Colin Jelf
2007	(United Kingdom) Colin Jelf
2008	(United Kingdom) Colin Jelf
2009	(Netherlands) Johan Coenradi
2010	(Netherlands) Johan Coenradi
2011	(Sweden) Erik Stark
2012	(Sweden) Erik Stark
2013	(Sweden) Erik Stark
2014	(Sweden) Erik Stark
2015	(Sweden) Pierre Lundin
2016	(Sweden) Pierre Lundin
2017	(United Arab Emirates) Rashed Al Qemzi
2018	(Italy) Alberto Comparato
2019	(United Arab Emirates) Rashed Al Qemzi
2020	(Portugal) Duarte Benavente
2021	(United Arab Emirates) Rashed Al Qemzi
2022	(Germany) Stefan Hagin
2023	(United Arab Emirates) Rashed Al Qemzi
2024	(United Arab Emirates) Rashed Al Qemzi
2025	(Sweden) Mathilda Wiberg
