= Ben Jelf =

British powerboat racer

Personal information
- Nationality: British
- Born: 2000 (age 25–26) Maidstone, Kent, England

Sport
- Sport: Powerboat racing
- Club: Jelf Racing / F1 Atlantic Team

Ben Jelf (born 2000) is a British powerboat racer from Maidstone, Kent. He competes in the F1H2O World Championship and is Britain's youngest world champion in powerboat racing, having won the GT15 World Championship at age 11 in 2011. He has won 17 British Championship titles and holds multiple British speed records.

== Early life and family ==
Jelf comes from the Jelf Racing family, a three-generation powerboat racing dynasty. His father Colin Jelf is a three-time UIM F2 World Champion, making history in 2008 as the first driver to win three consecutive F2 world titles. Jelf began racing at age nine, following his grandfather, father and uncle into the sport.

== Racing career ==
=== Junior career (2009–2018) ===
Jelf began competing in the GT15 class at age nine. In 2011, at age 11, he won the GT15 World Championship, becoming Britain's youngest powerboat racing world champion and the first GT15 European Champion. He successfully defended his European title in 2012 at Tallinn, Estonia, after a closely contested race against an 11-boat field.

Jelf accumulated four European Championship titles in the GT15 class during his junior career. He became Britain's most successful junior powerboat racer from age 11. He progressed through GT30 and F4 classes, winning five British Championship titles in GT30 and securing the GT30 European Championship in 2014. In 2018, he won a bronze medal at the F4 European Championship held at Aluksne, Latvia. By 2018, he had claimed his 14th and 15th British Championship titles.

=== Speed records ===
In 2018, at age 18, Jelf became the youngest British driver to break the 100 mph barrier in powerboat racing. At Coniston Records Week, he set British F2 and Supercat speed records at 124.27 mph and 124.38 mph respectively. This achievement made him the third generation of Jelf Racing to earn a K7 Gold Star, awarded to British water speed record holders.

In May 2025, Jelf broke a 41-year-old Lowestoft & Oulton Broad Motor Boat Club speed record, clocking 27.14 seconds in an F1H2O DAC hull. He surpassed the time set in 1984 by Tom Percival running a Hodges boat powered by a 3.5-litre Evinrude engine by 0.64 seconds. Jelf holds four world speed records and 10 British speed records across multiple classes.

=== F1H2O World Championship (2022–present) ===
Jelf joined the F1H2O World Championship for the final two races of the 2022 season in Sharjah, United Arab Emirates, competing for the F1 Atlantic Team alongside Portuguese driver Duarte Benavente. In his debut Grand Prix, he finished seventh and scored championship points. He finished 15th in the 2022 championship standings. Earlier in 2022, he won the CPA British F2 Championship, marking the first circuit racing title using Mercury Racing APX four-stroke power.

He finished 17th in the 2023 F1H2O World Championship after scoring his first full-season championship points with eighth place in Sharjah. In 2024, Jelf finished ninth in the championship, recording consistent performances including a career-best sixth place at the Grand Prix of Sardinia in June. He secured bronze medals in sprint races at Indonesia and Sharjah.

In 2025, Jelf opened his campaign with double bronze trophies at Lake Toba, Indonesia, finishing third in both Sprint Race 1 and the Grand Prix. He sat third in the championship standings after Indonesia. At the Grand Prix of Shanghai in October, he finished eighth in difficult weather conditions that were described as "by far the worst I've ever raced in", with the race being red-flagged on safety grounds after 11 of 32 laps.

At the penultimate round in Jeddah, Saudi Arabia, in late November, Jelf finished seventh in the Grand Prix and moved to joint-11th in the championship standings. He finished 13th in the final 2025 championship standings.

==== F1H2O World Championship results ====
Year	Result
2022	15th
2023	17th
2024	9th
2025	13th

=== British Championships ===
Alongside his international career, Jelf has competed extensively in British circuit racing. He has won 17 British Championship titles across GT15, GT30, F4 and F2 classes. In August 2024, he won the GT30 British Sprint Championship at Stewartby Lake, Bedfordshire, with a clean sweep of heat wins. In August 2025, he won bronze at the F2 British Sprint Championships at Stewartby. He worked with his father Colin testing and developing the Mercury 200APX engine and boat setup throughout his British Championship campaigns.

=== Other racing activities ===
Jelf has competed in the German powerboat series (2018), French Championship (2022), and the 24-hour Rouen endurance race (2019). In 2022, he competed as a navigator in OCRDA with Max Walker and was invited to race for Team Amaravati as an F4 driver at the F1H2O Grand Prix of India.
