= Mathilda Wiberg =

Swedish powerboat racer

- Born: 2003 (age 22–23); Sweden
- Education: Linnaeus University (Nautical Science Programme)
- Known for: First female Formula-class world champion in motorsport history
- Family: Hilmer Wiberg (brother, F2 racer)
- Awards: 2025 UIM Driver of the Year; 2025 UIM F2 World Champion; 2025 Smedjebacken Municipality Achievement Medal; 2023 S3 World Championship; 2022 F4 World Championship (bronze); 2021 F4 European Champion; 2019 3J World Champion

Mathilda Wiberg (born 2003) is a Swedish powerboat racer who made motorsport history in 2025 by becoming the first woman ever to win a Formula-class world championship in any form of motorsport. She claimed the 2025 UIM F2 World Championship after a dramatic season finale at the Grand Prix of Portugal II in Vila Velha de Ródão. Following her championship victory, she was named 2025 UIM Driver of the Year and received the prestationsmedalj achievement medal from Smedjebacken municipality.

== Early life and family background ==
Wiberg was born in Sweden and is from Åkersberga, a town located about 40 km north of Stockholm. She comes from a racing family deeply involved in powerboat racing. Her father introduced her to the sport when he was competing as a young man, and her younger brother Hilmer Wiberg is also a professional Formula 2 powerboat racer. The entire Wiberg family travels to races as a team under the banner of Wiberg Racing.

Wiberg made her powerboat racing debut in 2016.

== Racing career ==
=== Early championships (2016-2022) ===
Wiberg's breakthrough came in 2019 when she became the 3J World Champion, co-winning with Estonian driver Stefan Arand at Öregrund, Sweden. This victory established her as one of the youngest world champions in powerboat racing history.

In 2020, at age 17, she was the youngest competitor at the F4 World Championship at Viverone. Swedish media described her as "ensam tjej i formel 4" (the only girl in Formula 4), highlighting her pioneering role in the male-dominated sport.

Her success continued with the 2021 F4 European Championship victory and culminated in a bronze medal at the 2022 F4 World Championship, where she "improved and impressed throughout the series."

=== Formula 2 breakthrough (2023-2025) ===
In 2023, Wiberg achieved the S3 World Championship and made her debut in the UIM F2 World Championship, finishing 13th. She also became the focus of Swedish boating media, with Svenska Båtunionen describing her as having "definitivt siktet inställt på fler medaljer" (definitely having her sights set on more medals).

The 2024 season saw continued progress, including a victory at the Grand Prix of Lithuania that demonstrated her growing competitiveness at the highest level.

=== Historic 2025 championship ===
Wiberg scored two points in the season-opening round at Brindisi, followed by 20 points in Klaipėda and 12 points in Peso da Régua, leaving her within reach of the championship before the final round.[1]

The championship was decided at the Grand Prix of Portugal II in Vila Velha de Ródão on 21 September 2025. Starting from second position on the grid after qualifying behind Peter Morin, Wiberg controlled the race after both her main championship rivals were eliminated by mechanical failures. Championship leader and younger brother Hilmer Wiberg retired with technical problems on lap 25, while pole-sitter Peter Morin suffered an engine failure caused by a blown fuse.

Wiberg set a fastest lap of 53.814 seconds and won by a margin of 1.968 seconds over Lithuanian driver Edgaras Riabko, securing not only the race victory but the 2025 UIM F2 World Championship. The victory made her the first woman to win a Formula-class world championship in any form of motorsport.

Following her championship victory, Smedjebacken municipality recognised her achievement by awarding her the prestationsmedalj achievement medal. In January 2026, the Union Internationale Motonautique named her 2025 UIM Driver of the Year in recognition of her historic championship victory.

== Achievements and records ==
- 2025 UIM Driver of the Year
- 2025 UIM F2 World Champion - First female Formula-class world champion in motorsport history
- 2023 S3 World Championship
- 2022 F4 World Championship - Bronze medal
- 2021 F4 European Champion
- 2019 3J World Champion (with Stefan Arand)
- Winner of the Grand Prix of Portugal II (2025)
- Winner of the Grand Prix of Lithuania (2024)

== Equipment and team ==
Wiberg races for Wiberg Racing, the family team, using a Molgaard boat. Wiberg Racing has achieved multiple world championships across different categories including 3J, GT30, and GT15, plus European championships in GT30 and GT15.

== Legacy and impact ==
Wiberg's historic 2025 F2 World Championship victory represents a watershed moment for women in motorsport. Her achievement has been described as rewriting motorsport history and breaking the sport's "ultimate glass ceiling." Swedish media coverage emphasized that she has "för alltid skrivit in sig i historieböckerna" (forever written herself into the history books).

As stated by powerboat racing media: "The 2025 UIM F2 World Championship will be remembered not just for its compelling competition, but as the season when motorsport's ultimate glass ceiling was finally broken." Her triumph serves as validation for every young girl who has ever dreamed of competing at the highest level in motorsport.

== Personal life ==
Wiberg continues her studies toward becoming a ship captain while maintaining her racing career. In 2023, she received a SEK 50,000 elite sports scholarship from Linnaeus University in recognition of her achievements in both academics and elite sports. She has stated that her long-term goal was "to become the world champion" in Formula 2, which she achieved in 2025. She chose powerboat racing for "its enjoyable blend of racing and being on the water."

The Wiberg siblings found themselves as championship rivals during the 2025 season, with Hilmer leading the standings before the final race where technical problems ended his title hopes and cleared the path for Mathilda's historic victory.

== See also ==
- UIM F2 World Championship
- Powerboat racing
- Hilmer Wiberg
