= Alberto Comparato =

Italian powerboat racer (born 1997)

Personal information
- Nationality: Italian
- Born: October 1, 1997 (age 28) Chioggia, Veneto, Italy

Sport
- Sport: Powerboat racing
- Event: Formula 1 Powerboat World Championship

Alberto Comparato (born 1 October 1997) is an Italian powerboat racer who competes in the Formula 1 Powerboat World Championship. He is from Chioggia, in the Veneto region of northern Italy, and races under the Comparato F1 team, which is owned by his father, Fabio Comparato, a former F1H2O competitor and multiple world champion in lower classes.

== Early career ==
Comparato began karting at the age of six and moved into powerboat racing at eleven.

=== F4 (2014–2015) ===
In 2014, aged 16, Comparato won the UIM F4 World Championship, the UIM F4 European Championship, and the Italian F4 title in the same season. He retained the F4 world title in 2015 and added a second Italian championship.

=== UIM F2 (2016–2018) ===
Comparato moved to UIM F2 in 2016. He won on his debut at Lake Peurunka in Finland, the first of several victories that season. In 2018, after an extensive pre-season testing programme, he won the UIM F2 World Championship, becoming at 20 the youngest driver to take the title at that time.

== F1H2O career ==
=== 2019 ===
Comparato joined the F1 Atlantic Team for his F1H2O debut in 2019. He finished the season tenth overall, with a best result of sixth in Sharjah.

=== Comparato F1 Team (2021–2023) ===
From 2021, Comparato raced under the family team, which his father had previously operated between 2001 and 2010. He took his first F1H2O pole position at San Nazzaro in 2021 and his first podium, third place in Sharjah, in 2022, when he finished eighth in the championship, his best result to date at that level. He finished 11th in 2023, with fourth place in Olbia the season highlight.

=== Team Abu Dhabi (2024) ===
Comparato replaced Shaun Torrente at Team Abu Dhabi for 2024. The arrangement did not continue beyond one season.

=== Return to Comparato F1 (2025) ===
Comparato returned to the family team for 2025, partnered with Australian rookie Damon Cohen, with the team running a DAC hull. He finished fourth in Indonesia, his best grand prix result of the season. At Zhengzhou he retired after three laps with engine failure. He ended the season 11th with 29 points.

== Championship results ==
Year	Team	Championship position
2019	F1 Atlantic Team	10th
2021	Comparato F1	14th
2022	Comparato F1	8th
2023	Comparato F1	11th
2024	Team Abu Dhabi	—
2025	Comparato F1	11th

== Personal life ==
Comparato lives in Chioggia. He is in a relationship with Swedish powerboat racer Mathilda Wiberg, who won the UIM F2 World Championship in 2025.
