= Alec Weckström =

Finnish powerboat racer (born 1998)

- Nationality: Finland
- Born: 27 May 1998 (age 28) Helsinki, Finland

Alec Weckström (born 27 May 1998) is a Finnish professional powerboat racer who competes in the UIM F1H2O World Championship. He currently races for Victory Team in the series, having returned to top-level competition in 2025 after a two-year absence from the sport.

== Early life and karting career ==
Weckström was born in Helsinki, Finland. As a child, he was a karting sensation, competing at age eight against future Formula One talents including Max Verstappen, George Russell, Lance Stroll, and Lando Norris in both the Finnish and European Championships. He later switched his focus to powerboat racing, following in the footsteps of his father, Michael Weckström, who raced in F1H2O during 2002 and 2003.

== Junior powerboat career ==
After initially pursuing stunts and Supermoto racing with KTM 125cc karts, Weckström transitioned to powerboat racing in 2019. His rapid progression through the junior ranks was notable. In his fifth event, he secured pole position before fighting back from last place to finish second in the North European championship.

In 2020, Weckström competed in the UIM F4 World Championship, finishing as runner-up at Viverone, Italy, in only his seventh career start. At the championship finale, Finland dominated the podium with Alexander Lindholm taking gold, Weckström claiming silver, and Roope Virtanen earning bronze. This strong performance in F4 earned him a promotion to the top-tier F1H2O series.

== F1H2O career ==
=== 2021: Rookie season ===
Weckström made his F1H2O racing debut with Gillman Racing at the Grand Prix of San Nazzaro in Italy in 2021. The team was led by four-time World Champion Scott Gillman, with multi-time North American champion Greg Foster as his teammate. Despite a non-finish in his opening race, the Finnish driver scored his first championship point at the first of two races in Figueira da Foz, Portugal. He concluded his impressive rookie season with a second-place finish at the second Portuguese Grand Prix, ending the year in fifth place in the Drivers' Championship.

=== 2022: Fourth overall ===
The following season, Weckström improved his championship position, finishing fourth overall. His season highlights included a fourth-place finish in Mâcon and a third-place podium at San Nazzaro. After suffering a non-finish, he ended the season strongly with three consecutive fourth-place finishes in Sardinia and Sharjah. His consistent performances established him as a rising talent in the championship.

=== 2023–2024: Absence from the sport ===
Weckström did not start the opening race of the 2023 season and was subsequently absent from the sport throughout the remainder of 2023 and all of 2024. During this period, he was unable to secure a race seat despite his previous strong performances. He spent over two years away from competitive racing, during which he did not sit in a race boat at all.

=== 2025: Return and breakthrough victories ===
In December 2024, Victory Team announced that Weckström would join their lineup for the 2025 F1H2O World Championship alongside three-time World Champion Shaun Torrente and Emirati driver Ahmed Al Fahim. The signing marked his move to one of the championship's leading teams.

Weckström's return proved impressive. At the opening round at Lake Toba, Indonesia, he finished ninth in Sprint Race 2 and secured 15 points in the Grand Prix.

At the Grand Prix of Shanghai, Weckström was involved in a serious crash during qualifying. The incident occurred during Q2 when he temporarily lost consciousness and was hospitalized. Upon assessment, medical staff discovered the crash had temporarily affected his short-term memory, with Weckström later admitting he could not recall what he had eaten for breakfast or what currency he used. Despite the severity of the crash, he was passed fit to compete in Sprint Race 2 later that weekend.

At the Grand Prix of Zhengzhou, China, Weckström secured his maiden F1H2O Grand Prix victory after defending champion Jonas Andersson spun from pole position at the start and retired with technical issues. He also won his first sprint race at the same venue, holding off a late charge from Rusty Wyatt to win by just over two seconds. These victories came just one week after his serious qualifying crash in Shanghai.

Weckström finished the 2025 season in fifth place in the Drivers' Championship with 82 points. His teammate Shaun Torrente won the championship with 99 points, with Victory Team also claiming their first-ever Teams' Championship.

== Personal life ==
Weckström stands 178 cm (5 ft 10 in) tall and weighs 72 kg (159 lb). While he is Finnish, he races under a United Arab Emirates licence due to Victory Team's requirements for their drivers. However, the Finnish national anthem is played when he achieves victories.

His father, Michael Weckström, competed in F1H2O during 2002 and 2003, making Alec part of a second-generation powerboat racing family. The Weckströms represent the fourth father-son lineage to compete in the sport, following the Seebolds, Deguisnes, and others.

== Racing record ==
=== Career summary ===
Season	Series	Team	Position
2020	UIM F4 World Championship		2nd
2021	UIM F1H2O World Championship	Gillman Racing	5th
2022	UIM F1H2O World Championship	Gillman Racing	4th
2023	UIM F1H2O World Championship	Gillman Racing	20th^{†}
2025	UIM F1H2O World Championship	Victory Team	5th

^{†} Did not start opening race

== F1H2O career statistics ==
Debut: 2021

Grand Prix entered: 15

Race starts: 15

World Championships: 0

Best overall championship finish: 4th (2022)

Best race finish: 1st

Best qualifying position: 1st

Career podiums: 5

- Wins: 2
- 2nd place: 2
- 3rd place: 1

Career points: 172.0

Last win: Shanghai 2026

Last podium: 1st – Zhengzhou 2025

=== Career summary ===
Season	Series	Team	Position
2020	UIM F4 World Championship		2nd
2021	UIM F1H2O World Championship	Gillman Racing	5th
2022	UIM F1H2O World Championship	Gillman Racing	4th
2023	UIM F1H2O World Championship	Gillman Racing	20th^{†}
2025	UIM F1H2O World Championship	Victory Team	5th

^{†} Did not start opening race

== Notable achievements ==
- First F1H2O Grand Prix victory: Grand Prix of Zhengzhou, China (2025)
- First F1H2O Sprint Race victory: Zhengzhou Sprint Race 1, China (2025)
- First F1H2O podium: Grand Prix of Portugal 2, Figueira da Foz (2021, 2nd place)
- UIM F4 World Championship: Runner-up (2020)
- One of only three Finnish drivers to win an F1H2O Grand Prix (alongside Sami Seliö and Pertti Leppälä)
- Contributed to Victory Team's first-ever Teams' Championship (2025)
