= Edgaras Riabko =

Lithuanian motorboat racer

Edgaras Riabko (born 10 April 1984) is a Lithuanian powerboat racer and a double UIM F2 European Champion. He currently races in the UIM F2 World Championship and finished runner-up in the 2020 series. He is the 2026 UIM F2 World Champion.

== Lithuanian Motorboat Federation ==
Riabko is the president of the Lithuanian Motorboat Federation (Lietuvos Motorlaivių Federacija) and has organized international powerboat races in Kaunas, Kupiskis and Zarasai.

== Motorboat Academy ==
He set-up a motorboat academy (Lietuvoje motorlaivių akademija) in 2020 which will be used to train young children the basics of powerboat racing with safe and responsible behaviour.
