= Erik Stark =

Swedish powerboat racing driver

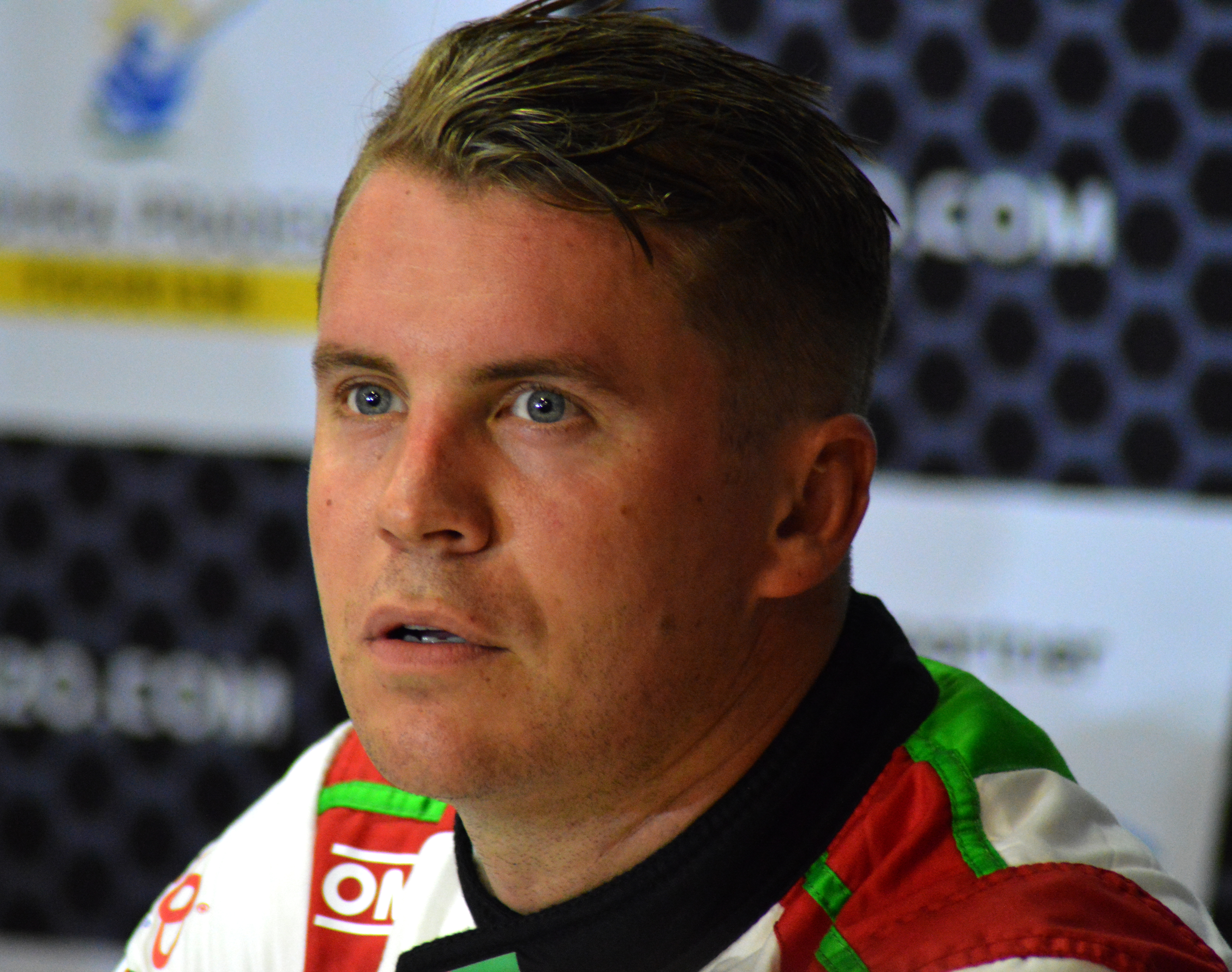
- Born: 13 November 1987 (age 38)

F1H2O World Championship career
- Debut season: 2014
- Current team: Victory Team
- Engine: Mercury
- Former teams: Team Sweden, Emirates Racing Team, Maverick F1 Team, Abu Dhabi Team
- Starts: 36
- Wins: 4
- Podiums: 10
- Poles: 6
- Best finish: First in 2018

Championship titles
- 2011, 2012, 2013, 2014, 2018: F2 World Champion, Offshore 3C and Thundercat P750 World Champion, F2 European Champion, F2 Nordic Champion, F1H2O Pole Position Trophy

Awards
- 2011, 2012, 2013, 2014, 2019: UIM Awarding Ceremony for F2 World Championship and F1H2O World Championship

Erik Stark (born 13 November 1987) is a Swedish powerboat racing driver who races in the F1H2O World Championship and in the XCAT World Championship for the United Arab Emirates-owned Victory Team. On the first round of 2021 UIM-F1H2O World Championship, Grand Prix of Europe, Stark raced with Gillman Racing Team.

He has won the title in the UIM F2 World Championship on four occasions and won world championships in offshore Class 3C and P750 (ThunderCat).

Stark has also won a hat-trick of F2 European Championships was F2 Nordic Champion four times.

As of December 2021, he held the record for winning four UIM F2 World Championship in a row.

Stark started in F1H2O in 2014 with Team Nautica and achieved his first win in 2017 with Team Sweden. In 2017 he finished 3rd in the World Championship and in 2018 he finished 2nd with the Abu Dhabi Team, only 4 points behind the winner. In 2018, he won the F1H2O Pole Position Trophy. During the summer of 2019, he joined the Dubai based Victory Team and made his debut in offshore powerboat racing Class 1 finishing on the podium.

== Personal life and awards ==
Born and raised in Stockholm, Sweden, Stark's interest in powerboat racing started in 1999 when his neighbor, a powerboat racing driver, introduced him to the powerboating world and encouraged him to get a license to drive boats. In 2000 Stark participated in his first race in Junior class S250, and in 2002 he won the Swedish Championship in that category. His racing career continued as he went up through the higher categories T400, F4 -S, F2, Thunder Cat, Offshore 3C, X-Cat, F1H2O and Class 1.

In 2009, Stark was elected rookie of the year. In 2011 and 2014 he was elected Nordic driver of the year, and in 2015, in occasion of the winning of his forth F2 World Title, he was awarded the "Konungens Jubeliums medalj" (King's Jubilee Medal) by the King of Sweden. In 2019 he was awarded at the Annual UIM Awarding Ceremony in Montecarlo for his second place at the F1H2O World Championship 2018.

== Early career ==
=== UIM S250 Swedish Championship ===
2002: Winner of the S250 Swedish Championship

=== UIM T400 European & Swedish Championship ===
2006: 3rd position T400 European Championship

2007: Winner of the T400 Swedish Championship

=== UIM F4-S World Championship ===
2006: Winner of the F4-S World Championship

=== UIM Scandinavian Cup F2000 ===
2007: 4th position Scandinavian Cup and Runner up of the year in the Scandinavian F2000 Cup

2008: 4th position Scandinavian Cup and Winner Sundsvall Formula 2000 Mercury Grand Prix

2009: 2nd position Scandinavian Cup and Winner Strängnäs Formula 2000 Mercury Grand Prix

=== UIM 3C Offhsore World Championship ===
2011: Winner of the UIM 3C Offshore World Championship

=== UIM THUNDERCAT P750 PRO World Championship ===
2012: Winner of the Thundercat P750 PRO World Championship

== F2 and F1H2O Career ==
=== UIM Scandinavian F2 OPEN ===
2010: 2nd position UIM Scandinavian F2 Open and Winner Karlskrona Scandinavian F2 Open

=== UIM F2 Nordic Championship ===
2010: Winner UIM F2 Nordic Championship

2011: Winner UIM F2 Nordic Championship and Nordic Driver of the year

2012: Winner UIM F2 Nordic Championship

2014: Winner UIM F2 Nordic Championship and Nordic Driver of the year

=== UIM F2 European Championship ===
2011:Winner UIM F2 European Championship

2012: Winner UIM F2 European Championship

2013: Winner UIM F2 European Championship

=== UIM F2 World Championship ===
2011: Winner UIM F2 World Championship

2012: Winner UIM F2 World Championship

2013: Winner UIM F2 World Championship

2014: Winner UIM F2 World Championship

=== UIM F1H2O World Championship ===
2014: 6th position UIM F1 World Championship

2015: 6th position UIM F1 World Championship

2016: 7th position UIM F1 World Championship

2017: 3rd position UIM F1 World Championship

2018: 2nd position UIM F1 World Championship

2019: 16th position UIM F1 World Championship

== Other categories ==
=== UIM Offshore XCAT World Championship ===
2013: 6th position UIM Offshore XCAT World Championship

2015: 5th position UIM Offshore XCAT World Championship

2016: 4th position UIM Offshore XCAT World Championship

2017: 4th position UIM Offshore XCAT World Championship

2021: 2nd position UIM Offshore XCAT World Championship

=== P1 Offshore CLASS 1 ===
2019: 3rd position Class 1 Roar Offshore Fort Myers Beach Powerboat Race
