= Duarte Benavente =

Portuguese powerboat racer

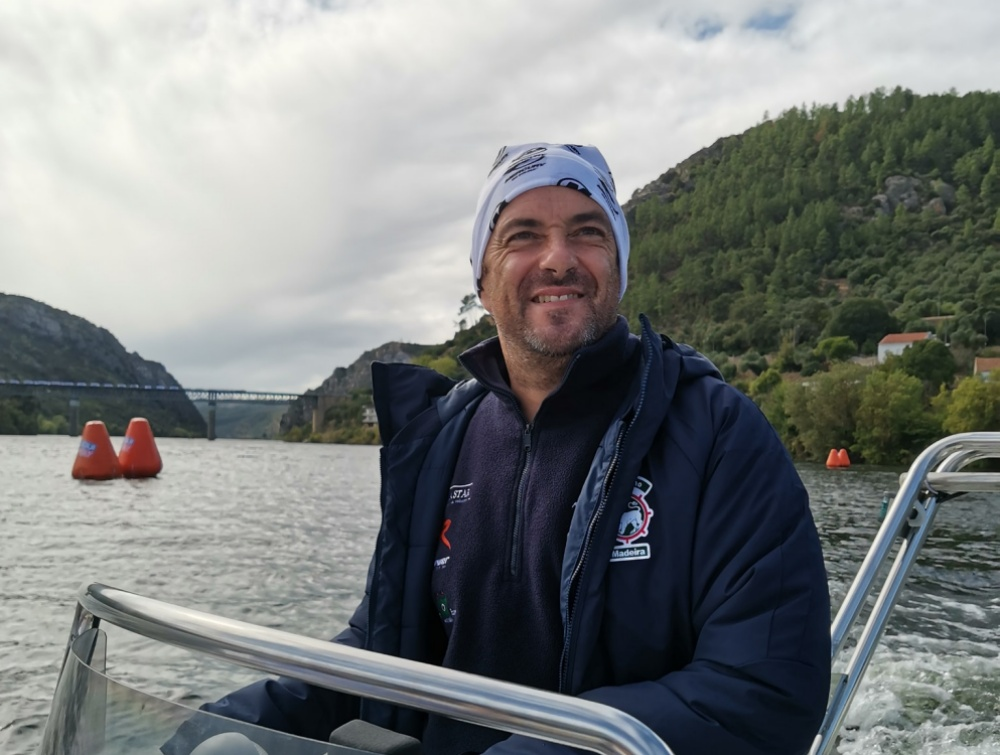
- Nationality: (Portugal) Portuguese
- Born: March 4, 1971 (age 55) Lisbon, Portugal

F1 Powerboat World Championship career
- Debut season: 1999
- Current team: F1 Atlantic Team
- Car number: 10
- Starts: 167
- Wins: 0
- Best finish: 6th in 2000

Previous series
- 2017-23 2019: UIM F2 World Championship; F2 European Championship

Championship titles
- 2020 2001: UIM F2 World Championship; S850/F4 World Champion

Duarte Benavente (born 4 March 1971 in Lisbon) is a Portuguese powerboat racer competing in the F1 Powerboat World Championship (F1H2O) for F1 Team Atlantic. He won the 2020 UIM F2 World Champion.

== Career ==
=== Early success ===
Benavente began his career in F4 powerboat championships. He achieved significant success in the Iberian F4 series, where he was crowned champion multiple times between 1995 and 1997. His achievements culminated in winning the European F4 Championship the following season. Throughout the late 1990s, Benavente secured a hat-trick of regional titles, holding both the Iberian and Portuguese F4 crowns.

=== F1H2O World Championship ===
Benavente made his debut in the prestigious F1H2O World Championship at the 1999 Grand Prix of Portugal in Portimão. Over his career in the series, he started over 160 races. His best individual race finish was 2nd place, and his highest qualifying position was 3rd. His best overall season performance in the F1H2O series was 6th place in the 2000 World Championship.

=== UIM F2 and S850 Championships ===
In addition to his F1H2O participation, Benavente competed in the UIM F2 World Championship between 2017 and 2023. This culminated in him winning the 2020 F2 World Championship title. Earlier in his career, Benavente also secured the title of 2001 S850 World Champion.

== Personal life ==
Benavente is based in Vila Fresca de Azeitão, Setubal. His father, Mario, is team manager for the F1 Atlantic Team in F1H20.
