= Mercury Marine =

Company

- Type: Division
- Industry: Marine engine manufacturer
- Founded: 1939
- Headquarters: Fond du Lac, Wisconsin, United States of America
- Key people: Carl Kiekhaefer
- Parent: Brunswick Corporation
- Website: https://www.mercurymarine.com/

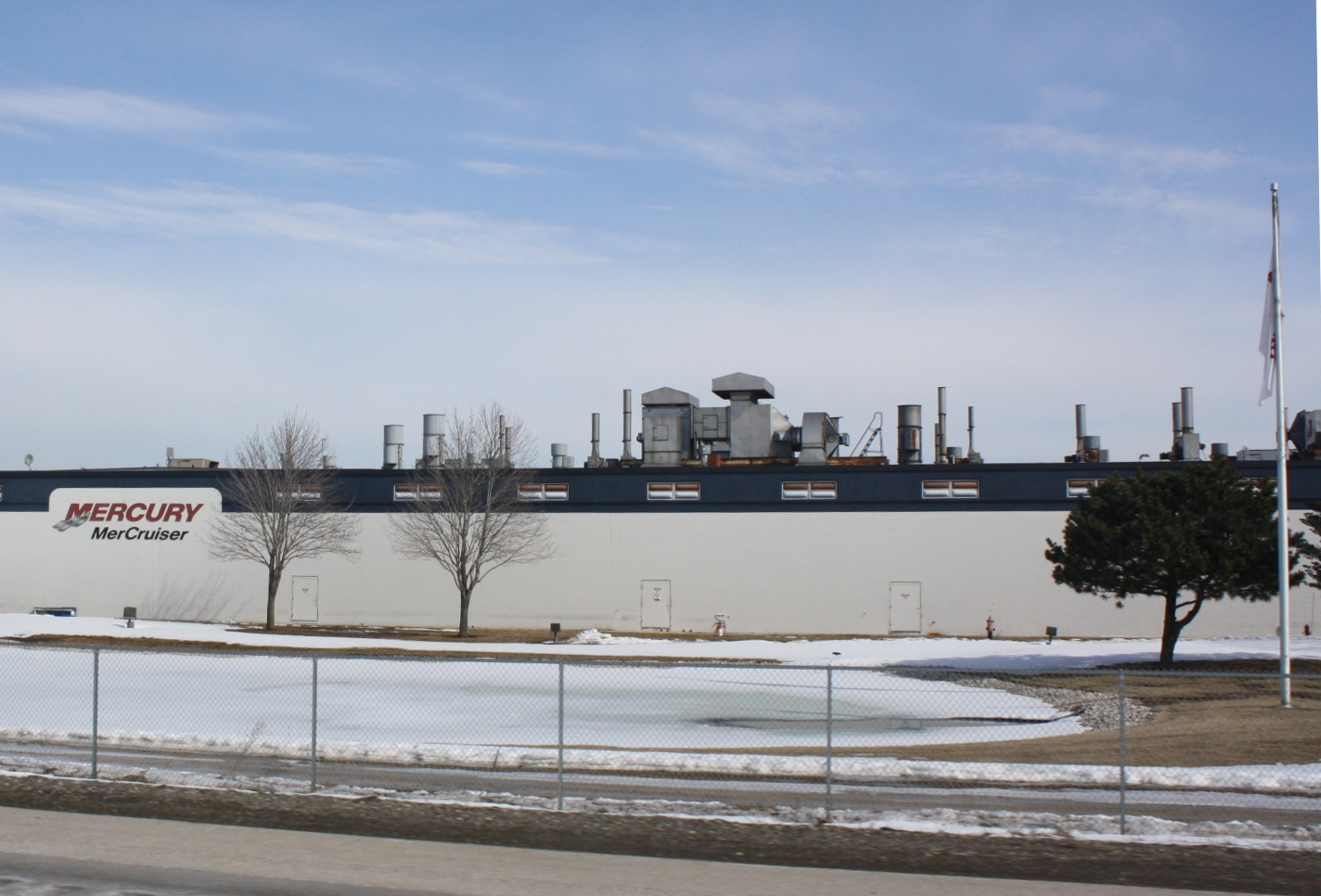
Headquarters

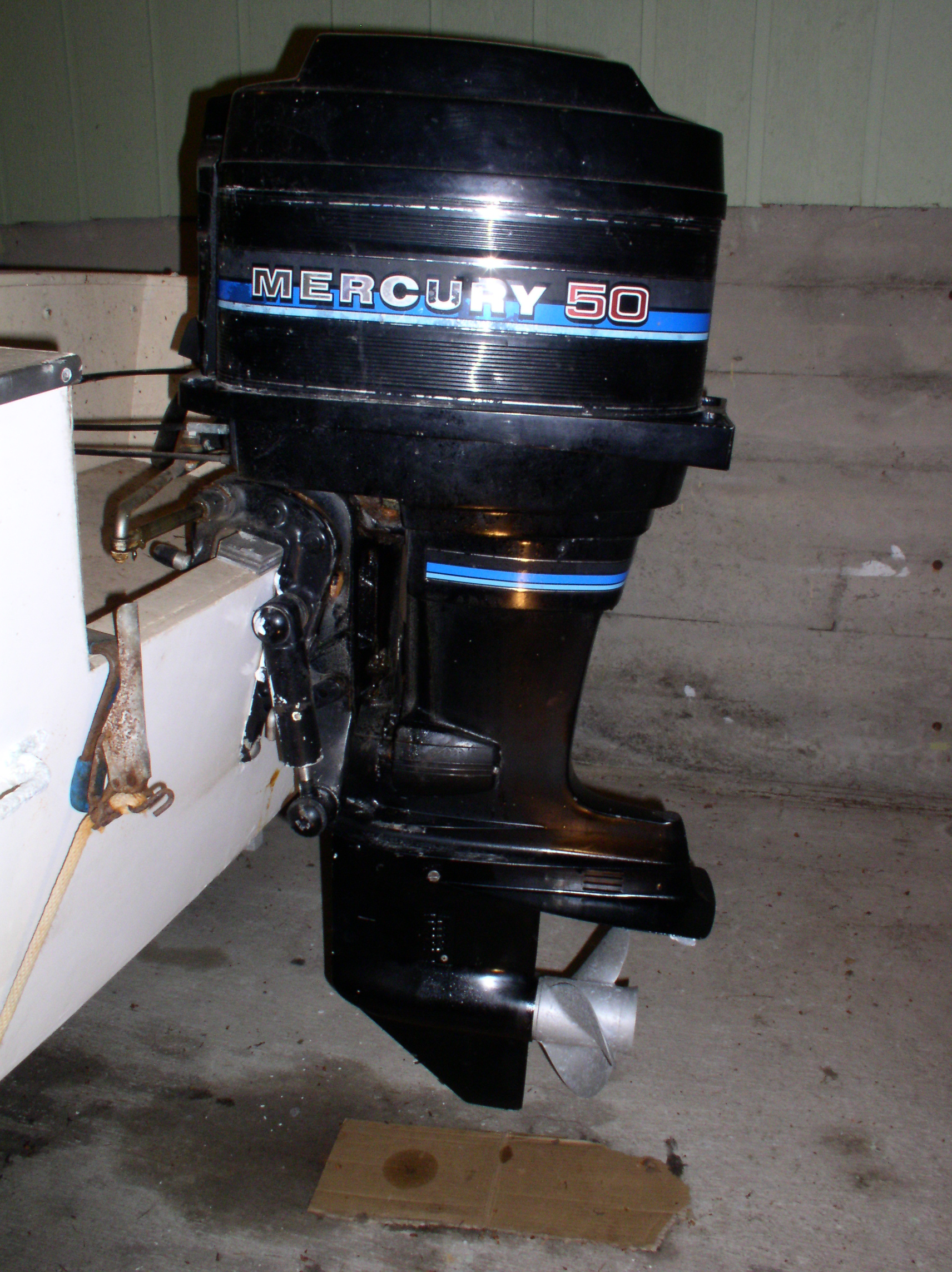
A Mercury 50 HP outboard motor circa 1980

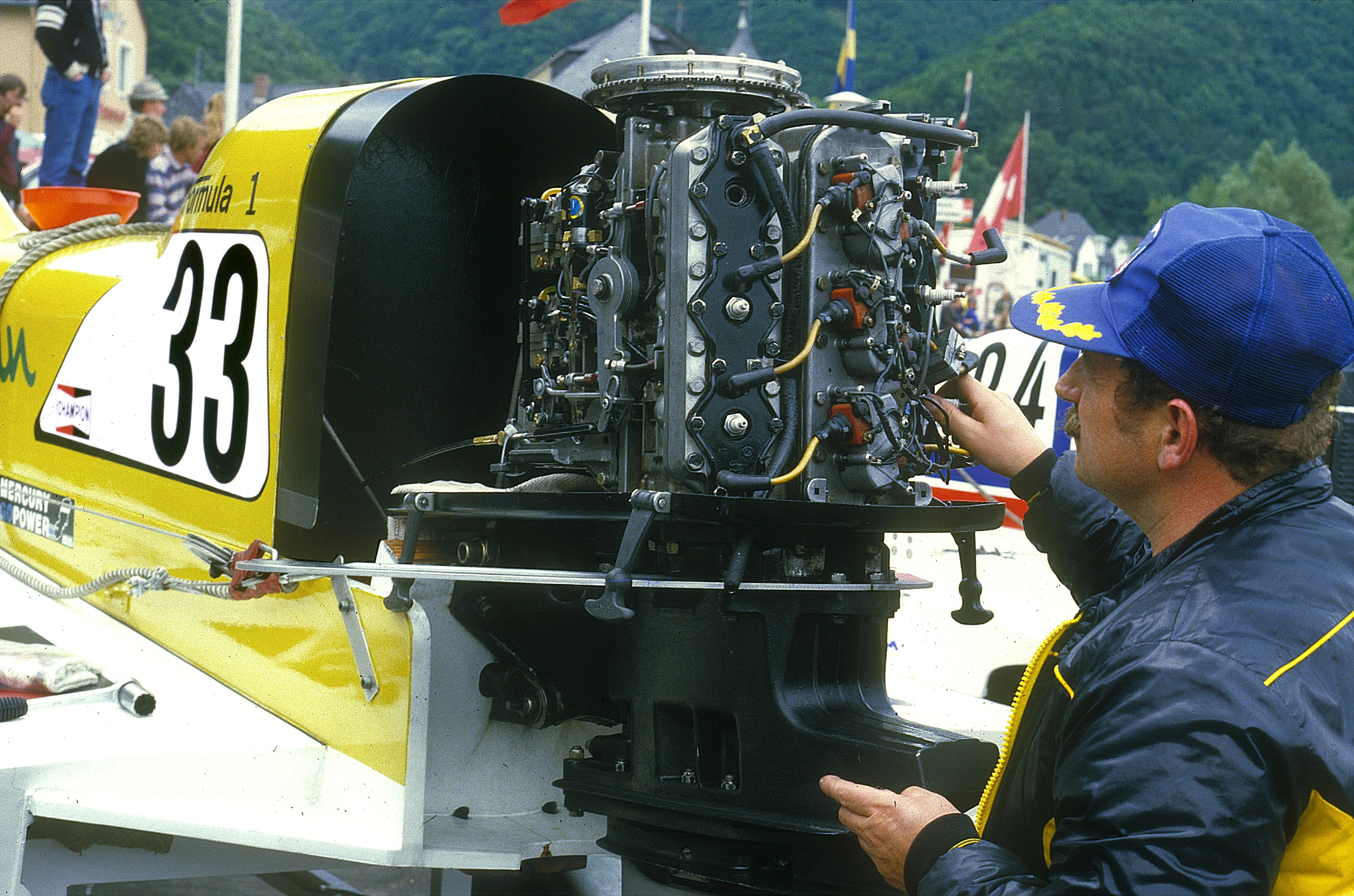
Six cylinder two-stroke engine in 1984

Mercury Marine is a marine engine division of Brunswick Corporation headquartered in Fond du Lac, Wisconsin. The main product line is outboard motors. It also produces the MerCruiser line of sterndrives and inboard engines, as well as a lineup of electric outboard motors. Utilizing modular and portable 48V lithium-ion batteries and transverse flux motor technology, these yield high torque with optimum efficiency.

Mercury's engines are manufactured in Fond du Lac, Wisconsin and Mercury is the only US outboard engine manufacturer and the only outboard engine manufacturer with a V12, 600hp outboard engine.

== History ==
=== Founding ===
The Kiekhaefer Mercury company began in 1939 when engineer Carl Kiekhaefer purchased a small outboard motor company in Cedarburg, Wisconsin. Kiekhaefer's original intention for the Kiekhaefer Corporation was to make magnetic separators for the dairy industry. The purchase included 300 defective outboard motors. Kiekhaefer and a small staff of employees rebuilt the motors and sold them to Montgomery Ward, a mail-order company. The motors were much improved, so the buyer purchased more. Kiekhaefer designed motors that withstood the elements better than his competition and called the motor Mercury (taking advantage of the "Mercury" Motor Car popularity at the time) while adopting the logo of the Roman god Mercury.

Kiekhaefer took more than 16,000 orders at the 1940 New York Boat Show.

=== World War II ===
World War II changed the corporate climate, and Kiekhaefer sought a government contract to design two-man air-cooled chainsaws. Army engineers had been unable to design a lightweight motor. Kiekhaefer designed a new lightweight chainsaw in 2 months. The Kiekhaefer powered chainsaw was able to cut through a 24-inch (610 mm) green log in 17 seconds, while it took the nearest competitor 52 seconds. Mercury was awarded the contract, and was the world's largest chainsaw manufacturer by the end of the war.

=== Post-war 1940s ===
Kiekhaefer Mercury foresaw that the average American's interest in boating would increase after the war. Kiekhaefer introduced a 19.8 cubic inch, 10 horsepower (hp), two-cylinder alternate firing design engine at the 1947 New York Boat Show called the "Lightning" or KE-7. This engine, also called the "Super 10", actually developed around 14 horsepower. Its designation was updated to KF-7 for 1949. For 1951 the engine block, though still displacing 19.8 cubic inches, was updated a great deal, and given the name "Hurricane". The 1951 kg-7 "Super 10" featured this engine, which developed around 16 horsepower. For 1952, this model was updated with a "forward, neutral, reverse" gearset, and a twist grip throttle. It was renamed "Cruiser" at this point, and no longer called "Super 10". This engine later became the heart of the "Mark 25", of the mid to late fifties. Initially rated at 16 horsepower, this engine was soon beefed up to 20. There was also an "H" version, which produced more power but carried no rating. "H" version Mercurys were mostly used for racing.

In 1949, the company also introduced its first large outboard, the approximately 40 cubic inch, 4 cylinder in line, "Thunderbolt". This engine was rated at 25 horsepower, but actually put out around 28. There was soon an "H" version designed for high rpm use. This version put out nearly 40 horsepower, while being rated at "25+". The Thunderbolt engine benefited from upgrades and updates, eventually becoming the Mark 40, Mark 50, and Mark 55 engines of the mid and late fifties. All of these were rated quite accurately at 40 horsepower. The Mark 55H (high speed) developed more, but carried no rating.

Due to a rather large gap between the Mark 25 (20 hp) and the Mark 55 (40 hp), Mercury brought out the 4 in line, approximately 30 cubic inch "Mark 30" (30 horsepower) engine for 1956, and produced versions of its "TurboFour" engine for several years. It, too, was available as an "H" version, producing much extra horsepower for racing and sporting use.

Smaller engines included the K era and the Mark era, such as the "Super 5" and later, such engines as the "Mark 6" and the "Mark 10".

=== 1950s ===
In 1957 Kiekhaefer started testing at a Florida lake he called "Lake X" to keep the location secret. Later that year the Kiekhaefer Mercury company designed a new inline 6-cylinder, 60 cubic inch, 60 hp (45 kW) engine named "Mark 75". Like its 2- and 4-cylinder brethren, the Mark 75 featured internal reed valves. The reed valve blocks served as intermediate main bearings. Because the valves occupied space already necessary for the main bearings instead of mounting to an extension of the crankcase, crankcase volume was minimized, resulting in a higher crankcase compression ratio, and more power in proportion to displacement than the competition.

Mercury's first 6-cylinder engines featured "direct reversing". Instead of a lower unit with forward, neutral and reverse gears, its lower units were more compact, with only drive and driven gears, and no submerged shift mechanism required. Reverse was selected by turning off the engine and restarting it in the opposite rotation, and neutral by simply switching off. Mark 75s, like many of their smaller brethren, were available in an "H" (high speed) version. Many of these large H engines sported open headers for competition and produced 90 horsepower from 60 cubic inches. Two totally stock Mark 75s set a world endurance record on Lake X, running 50,000 miles at an average of 30.3 mph, while being refueled on the fly. The boats were stopped only for driver changes and standard maintenance. After the record-setting run was completed, the motors were torn down and inspected for wear. They were found to be well within factory tolerances.

For 1958, an enlarged version of this engine was introduced. The new "Mark 78" had 70 horsepower with 66 cubic inches of displacement. No "H" version was offered. Also in 1958, a stock Mark 75H set a new world speed record for outboard motors, of 107 mph.

==== NASCAR racing ====
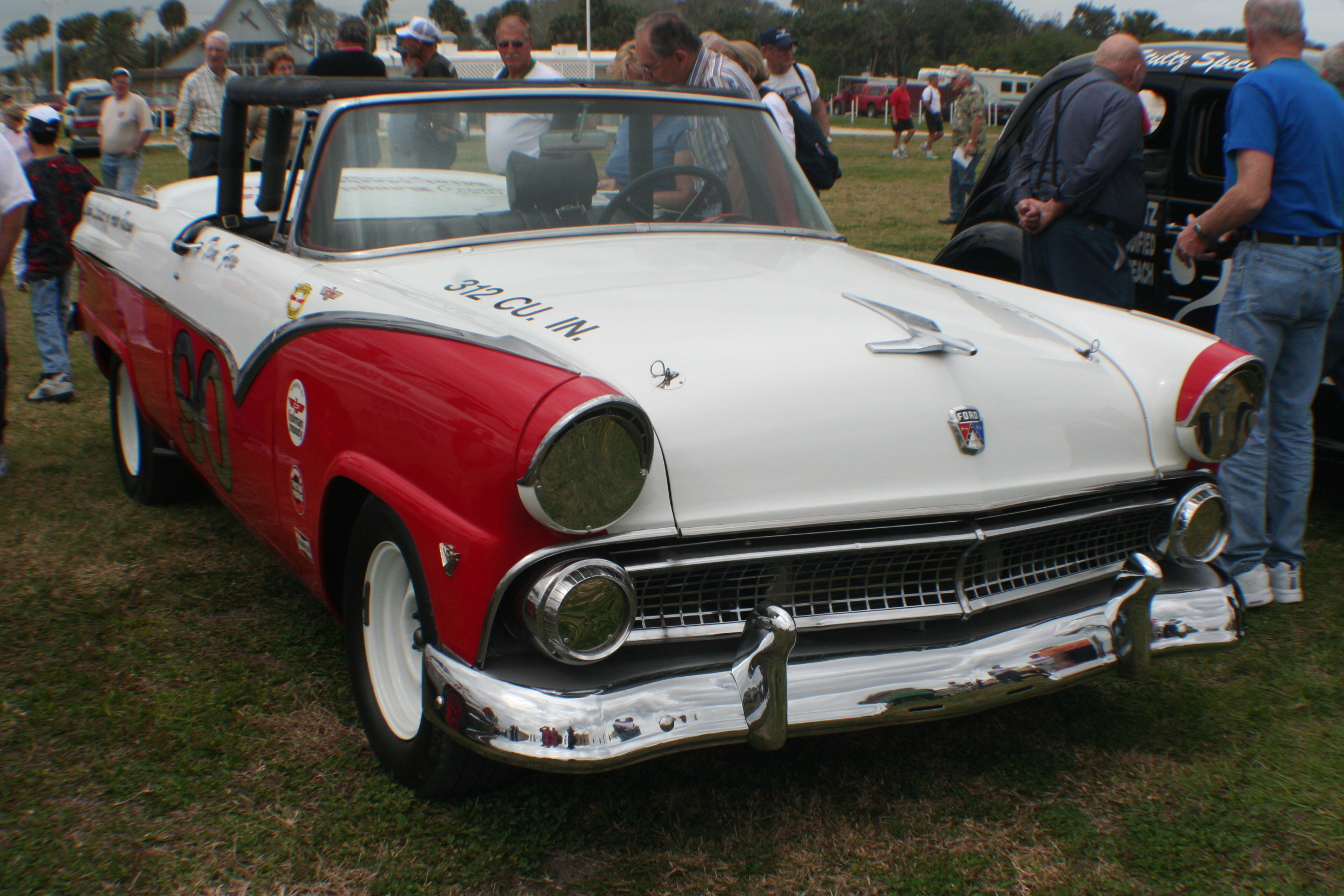
1955 Tim Flock racing car

Kiekhaefer decided to promote his company by owning a NASCAR and AAA team. The team dominated NASCAR Grand National (at one point winning 16 straight races), even though it only competed in 1955 and 1956. The team won the 1955 and 1956 NASCAR championships with drivers Tim Flock and Buck Baker. One of Kiekhaefer's innovations was using dry paper air filters, which are still standard in automobiles today.

=== 1960s ===
When Kiekhaefer Mercury's top-of-the-line, 80 horsepower (74 cubic inch) model "Merc 800" was introduced for 1960, direct reversing as standard equipment was optionally replaced by full forward, neutral and reverse gear shifting, as on Mercury's 2- and 4-cylinder models, and "thru-hub" exhaust was introduced. Previously, as with other outboard brands and Mercury's smaller models, exhaust exited from a chute at the rear of the cavitation plate above the propeller. Thru-hub exhaust was claimed to be more efficient by omitting the added drag of an exhaust chute, and using the low-pressure area necessarily created by the gear housing and propeller moving through the water to assist in exhaust evacuation. Over the next several years, through-hub exhaust became a standard feature of all Mercury models, and later was adopted near industry-wide for both outboards and stern-drives.

With Mercury Marine outboards typically having smaller displacement per horsepower and better fuel economy than the competition's motors, an ad ran in publications showing a Mercury-powered boat pulling an elephant on a large ski-like platform. The caption simply read "Mercury, pulls an elephant. Runs on peanuts."

In 1961 the company merged with the Brunswick Corporation.

The company introduced the MerCruiser stern-drive line at the 1961 Chicago Boat Show. The line would later take over 80 percent of the world market.

For 1962, the Merc 1000 became the new top of the line in line 6, offering 100 hp. It was somewhat of a sensation. It also introduced the new "Phanton Black" paint scheme which soon spread to the entire line and became famous.

In 1966, 6-cylinder Mercury models featured the introduction of electronic ignition, another first that eventually became an industry standard.

Carl Kiekhaefer resigned as President of Kiekhaefer Mercury in 1970, and the name was changed to Mercury Marine in 1972. During this time, Mercury produced snowmobiles, like many other companies in the late 1960s. The first ones incorporated a 250 cc two-man chainsaw engine.

=== 1970s ===
In 1971, they came out with the Rocket and Lightning models of snowmobiles. These sleds combined aluminum tunnels with Canadian Curtiss Wright (CCW) engines. The Rocket was a 340, and the Lightning a 400 with electric start. By 1972, Mercury started production of the Hurricane, a more modern snowmobile with optional slide rail suspension (as opposed to bogie wheel). In 1974, Mercury introduced the Sno-Twister 400cc snowmobile designed primarily for racing. It featured a Kohler free-air engine and succeeded in dominating the 400cc class.

In 1975 Mercury introduced 340cc and 440cc versions of the Sno-Twister and both were dominant at the track. 1976 saw a change in the Sno-Twister, this time 250cc, 340cc, and 440cc versions were all introduced. These were radical for their time and were the result of Mercury Sno Pro sleds developed and raced the previous year. These 1976 sleds were featured water-cooled Kohler engines. The chassis were small, lightweight, very low profile, with curved handlebars and seat cushions that were designed for left turns (oval tracks).

In 1975 and 1976 Mercury also produced the Trail Twister snowmobiles which were available in 340cc and 440cc which were fan-cooled. These were some of the fastest lake racers around in their day. This started off a new era in snowmobile construction for the whole industry and the sled's basic format set up what is seen today in modern snowmobiles.

== Engine specifications ==
Year	Model	Displacement (CID)	Type	Comp.	HP	TKS/MPI	WOT (RPM)	Weight (lbs)	Alpha Ratio (lbs)	Bravo One Ratio (lbs)	Bravo Two Ratio (lbs)	Bravo Three Ratio (lbs)
1999	5.0L	5.0 L (5,000 cc; 310 cu in)	V8	9.3:1	190	Carb	4200-4600					
1991–1995	5.0LX	5.0 L (5,000 cc; 310 cu in)	V8	9.3:1	205	Carb	4200-4600					
1991–1995	5.7L	5.7 L (5,700 cc; 350 cu in)	V8	9.3:1	235	Carb	4200-4600					
1991–1995	350 MAG	5.7 L (5,700 cc; 350 cu in)	V8	9.3:1	250	Carb	4400-4800					
2010		3.0 L (3,000 cc; 180 cu in)	I4	9.3:1	135	TKS	4400–4800		2.00, 2.40 (635)			
2010		3.0 L (3,000 cc; 180 cu in)	I4	9.3:1	135	MPI	4400–4800		2.00, 2.40 (695)			
2010		4.3 L (4,300 cc; 260 cu in)	V6	9.4:1	190	TKS	4400–4800		1.62, 1.81, 2.00 (848)		2.00, 2.20 (893)	2.20, 2.43 (902)
2010		4.3 L (4,300 cc; 260 cu in)	V6	9.4:1	220	MPI	4400–4800		1.47, 1.62, 1.81 (865)		2.00, 2.20 (912)	2.20, 2.43 (921)
2010		5.0 L (5,000 cc; 310 cu in)	V8	9.4:1	220	TKS	4400–4800		1.62, 1.81 (946)	1.50, 1.65 (987)	2.00, 2.20 (1004)	2.00, 2.20, 2.43 (1013)
2010		5.0 L (5,000 cc; 310 cu in)	V8	9.4:1	260	MPI	4600–5000		1.47, 1.62, 1.81 (952)	1.50, 1.65 (993)	2.00, 2.20 (1010)	2.00, 2.20, 2.43 (1019)
2010	350 MAG	5.7 L (5,700 cc; 350 cu in)	V8	9.4:1	300	MPI	4800–5200		1.47 (946)	1.36, 1.50, 1.65 (987)	2.00, 2.20 (1004)	2.00. 2.20, 2.43 (1013)
2010	377 MAG	6.2 L (6,200 cc; 380 cu in)	V8	9.0:1	320	MPI	4800–5200			1.36, 1.50, 1.65 (993)	2.00, 2.20 (1010)	2.00, 2.20, 2.43 (1019)
2010	496 MAG	8.1 L (8,100 cc; 490 cu in)	V8	9.1:1	375	MPI	4400–4800			1.36, 1.50, 1.65 (1199)	1.81, 2.00, 2.20 (1214)	1.26, 1.35, 1.50 (1224)
2010	496 MAG HO	8.1 L (8,100 cc; 490 cu in)	V8	9.1:1	425	MPI	4600–5000			1.36, 1.50, 1.65 (1199)	1.81, 2.00, 2.20 (1214)	1.81, 2.00, 2.20 (1224)
2010	8.2 MAG	8.2 L (8,200 cc; 500 cu in)	V8	8.75:1	380	MPI	4400–4800	1080		1.26, 1.35, 1.36, 1.50, 1.65	1.81, 2.00, 2.20	1.65, 1.81, 2.00, 2.20, 2.43
2010	8.2 MAG HO	8.2 L (8,200 cc; 500 cu in)	V8	8.75:1	430	MPI	4600–5000	1080		1.26, 1.35, 1.36, 1.50, 1.65	1.81, 2.00, 2.20	1.65, 1.81, 2.00, 2.20, 2.43
2019	300 Verado	4.6 L (4,600 cc; 280 cu in)	V8		300		5200–6000	600				

== Today ==
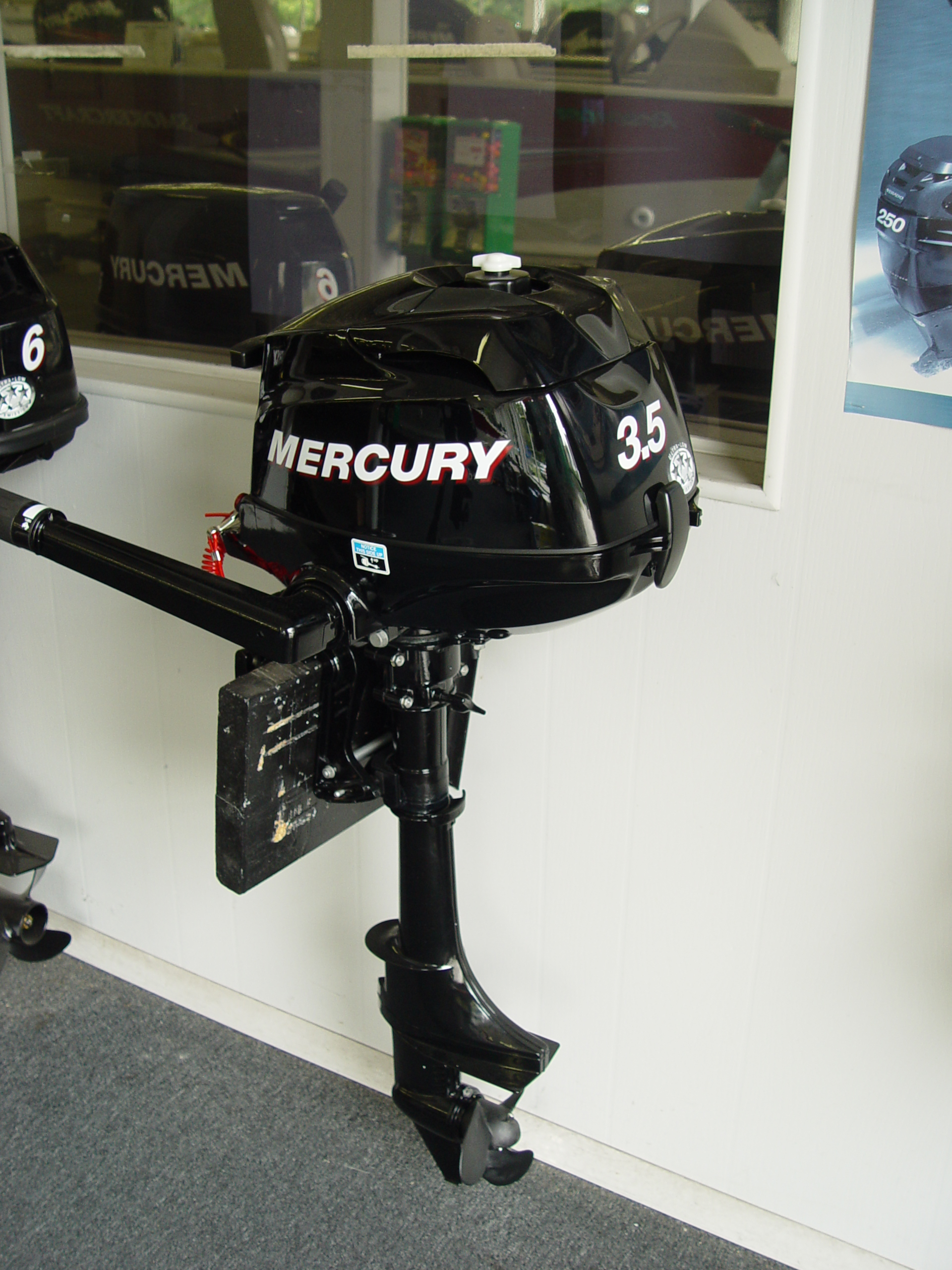
A 2007, 3.5 horsepower Mercury engine

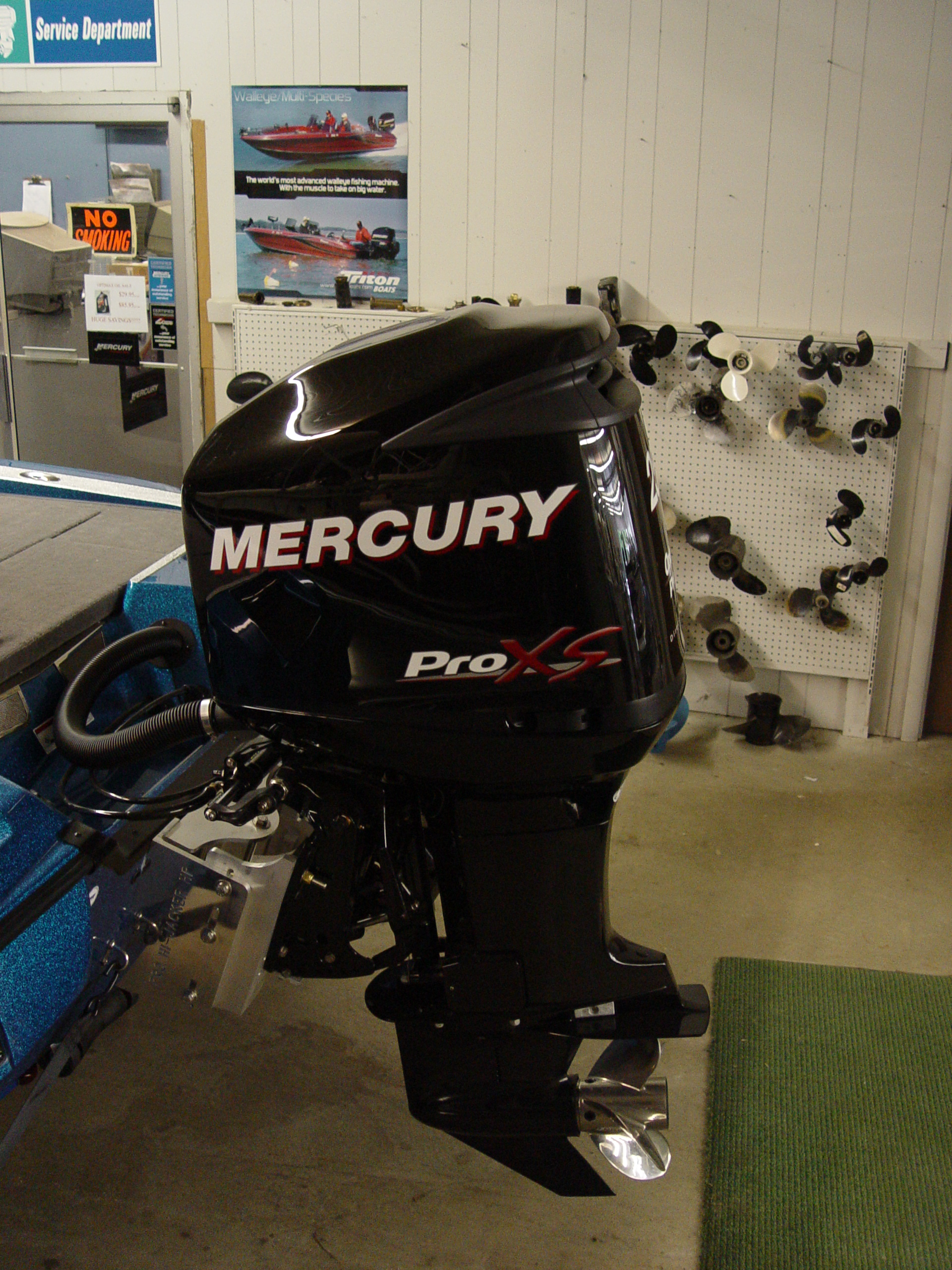
A 2008, 250 horsepower Mercury ProXS series engine

Current Mercury product brands include Mercury, Mercury Racing, MerCruiser, and Mariner outboards (sold outside the U.S.). Outboard sizes range from 2.5 horsepower (1.9 kW) to 600 horsepower (450 kW). MerCruiser sterndrives and inboards range from 135 to 430 horsepower (320 kW) and Mercury Racing outboards produce up to 450 horsepower (340 kW) and sterndrives to 1,750 horsepower (1,300 kW). Subsidiaries include Mercury Precision Parts and Accessories as well as Mercury propellers and Mercury Jet Drives. Mercury outboards 30 hp and below are manufactured by Tohatsu in Japan.

Mercury developed a processor-enhanced line of outboards called the "Verado" outboard engine. The "Verado" system integrates the outboard into an entire system, including "fly-by-wire" steering and advanced diagnostics. Verado engines are available in 250 hp and 300 hp (V8), 350 hp and 400 hp (V10, introduced in 2022), and 600 hp (V12) as of early 2021.

Mercury Marine has continued to make improvements in the marine sector with their new variation of racing motors. These motors are engineered to be high-performance speed motors that feature a Sportsmaster gear case made for these high speeds. The racing model of these engines is available in 60R hp 4L, 150R hp V6, 200R hp V6 (introduced in 2024), 250R hp V8, 300R hp V8 (introduced in 2018), 400R hp V10 (introduced in 2018), 450R V8 (introduced in 2019), and 500R V8 (introduced in 2023).

Mercury Marine has introduced what they call a "ROS" (Racing Offshore Midsection) in 2026. This is a 300R with an advanced and shorter midsection; this new 15-inch midsection will allow for greater speed in racing competition. Mercury has also introduced their "APX" line with the 60 hp, 250 hp, and 360 hp in 2026. This motor is specifically made for tunnel hull-style boats for course racing. The "APX" lineup offers a superior power-to-weight ratio needed for these lightweight race boats. Following these two new lineups of marine power, they have displayed a concept for an 808 hp supercharged 7.6L V12 behemoth. This behemoth was showcased at the Miami International Boat Show in 2026 and is supposed to be the successor to the previous 600 hp platform, building off the 7.6L V12 and adding a supercharger to it. Allowing it to push luxury boats and yachts up to 70 feet..

In 2007 Mercury Marine began selling its Zeus drive system. Developed by Mercury and its joint venture company Cummins MerCruiser Diesel (CMD), the Zeus drive is a dual-engine pod drive system. Some of the most notable benefits from this class design for boaters will be enhanced helm control. While underway an automated trim control feature simplifies operation. Also, Zeus includes Skyhook Electronic Anchor which will keep a vessel in a fixed location within a tight range. The system might be called all weather as it will maintain location in strong currents and winds.

Mercury’s brand portfolio includes Mercury and Mariner, Mercury MerCruiser sterndrives and inboard engines, MotorGuide trolling motors, Mercury and Teignbridge propellers, Mercury inflatable boats, Mercury SmartCraft electronics, and Mercury and Quicksilver parts and oils. MotoTron electronic controls was also a part of Mercury Marine, but as of October 2008 Brunswick Corp. sold MotoTron and its intellectual properties to Woodward Governor of Fort Collins, Colorado.

Mercury Marine also provides various training programs through its training arm called Mercury University.
